The BBC Television Shakespeare is a series of British television adaptations of the plays of William Shakespeare, created by Cedric Messina and broadcast by BBC Television. Transmitted in the UK from 3 December 1978 to 27 April 1985, it spanned seven series and thirty-seven episodes.

Development began in 1975 when Messina saw that the grounds of Glamis Castle would make a perfect location for an adaptation of Shakespeare's As You Like It for the Play of the Month series. Upon returning to London, however, he had come to envision an entire series devoted exclusively to the dramatic works of Shakespeare. When he encountered a less than enthusiastic response from the BBC's departmental heads, Messina bypassed the usual channels and took his idea directly to the top of the BBC hierarchy, who greenlighted the show. Experiencing financial, logistical and creative problems in the early days of production, Messina persevered and served as executive producer for two years. When he was replaced by Jonathan Miller at the start of series three, the show experienced something of a creative renaissance as strictures on the directors' interpretations of the plays were loosened, a policy continued under Shaun Sutton, who took over as executive producer for series five, six and seven. By the end of its run, the series had proved both a ratings and a financial success.

Initially the adaptations received generally negative reviews, although the reception improved somewhat as the series went on, and directors were allowed more freedom, leading to interpretations becoming more daring. Several episodes are now held in high esteem, particularly some of the traditionally lesser known and less frequently staged plays. The complete set is a popular collection, and several episodes represent the only non-theatrical production of the particular play currently available on DVD. Beginning May 26, 2020, all 37 plays are available to stream in North America via BritBox.

Introduction

Origins
The concept for the series originated in 1975 with Cedric Messina, a BBC producer who specialised in television productions of theatrical classics, while he was on location at Glamis Castle in Angus, Scotland, shooting an adaptation of J.M. Barrie's The Little Minister for the BBC's Play of the Month series. During his time on set, Messina realised that the castle grounds would make a perfect location for an adaptation of Shakespeare's As You Like It. By the time he had returned to London, however, his idea had grown considerably, and he now envisioned an entire series devoted exclusively to the dramatic work of Shakespeare; a series which would adapt all thirty-seven Shakespearean plays.

Almost immediately upon pitching the idea to his colleagues, however, Messina began to encounter problems. He had anticipated that everyone in the BBC would be excited about the concept, but this did not prove so. In particular, the Drama/Plays division felt the series could not possibly be a financial success without international sales, which they did not see as likely. Furthermore, they argued that Shakespeare on television rarely worked, and they were of the opinion that there was simply no need to do all thirty-seven plays, as many were obscure and would not find an audience amongst the general public, even in England. Disappointed with their lack of enthusiasm, Messina went over the departmental heads, forwarding his proposal directly to Director of Programmes, Alasdair Milne and Director-General, Ian Trethowan, both of whom liked the idea. Although there were still reservations within the BBC, and although Messina's decision to bypass the accepted hierarchy would not be forgotten, with the support of Milne and Trethowan, the series was greenlighted, with its daunting scope championed as part of its appeal; "it was a grand project, no one else could do it, no one else would do it, but it ought to be done." Writing several months into production, journalist Henry Fenwick wrote the project was "gloriously British, gloriously BBC."

Shakespeare on the BBC
The BBC had screened many Shakespearean adaptations before, and by 1978, the only plays which they had not shown in specifically made-for-TV adaptations were Henry VIII, Pericles, Timon of Athens, Titus Andronicus and The Two Gentlemen of Verona. However, despite this level of experience, they had never produced anything on the scale of the Shakespeare Series. Exclusively made-for-television Shakespearean productions had commenced on 5 February 1937 with the live broadcast of Act 3, Scene 2 from As You Like It, directed by Robert Atkins, and starring Margaretta Scott as Rosalind and Ion Swinley as Orlando. Later that evening, the wooing scene from Henry V was broadcast, directed by George More O'Ferrall, and starring Henry Oscar as Henry and Yvonne Arnaud as Katherine. O'Ferrall would oversee numerous broadcasts of Shakespearean extracts over the course of 1937, including Mark Antony's funeral speech from Julius Caesar, with Henry Oscar as Antony (11 February), several scenes between Benedick and Beatrice from Much Ado About Nothing, featuring Henry Oscar and Margaretta Scott (also 11 February), several scenes between Macbeth and Lady Macbeth from Macbeth, starring Laurence Olivier and Judith Anderson (25 March), and a heavily truncated version of Othello, starring Baliol Holloway as Othello, Celia Johnson as Desdemona and D.A. Clarke-Smith as Iago (14 December).

Other 1937 productions included two different screenings of scenes from A Midsummer Night's Dream; one directed by Dallas Bower, starring Patricia Hilliard as Titania and Hay Petrie as Nick Bottom (18 February), the other an extract from Stephen Thomas' Regent's Park production, starring Alexander Knox as Oberon and Thea Holme as Titania, aired as part of the celebrations for Shakespeare's birthday (23 April). 1937 also saw the broadcast of the wooing scene from Richard III, directed by Stephen Thomas, and starring Ernest Milton as Richard and Beatrix Lehmann as Lady Anne (9 April). In 1938, the first full-length broadcast of a Shakespearean play took place; Dallas Bower's modern dress production of Julius Caesar at the Shakespeare Memorial Theatre, starring D.A. Clark-Smith as Mark Antony and Ernest Milton as Caesar (24 July). The following year saw the first feature length made-for-TV production; The Tempest, also directed by Bower, and starring John Abbott as Prospero and Peggy Ashcroft as Miranda (5 February). The vast majority of these transmissions were broadcast live, and they came to an end with the onset of war in 1939. None of them survive now.

After the war, Shakespearean adaptations were screened much less frequently, and tended to be more 'significant' specifically made-for-TV productions. In 1947, for example, O'Ferrall directed a two-part adaptation of Hamlet, starring John Byron as Hamlet, Sebastian Shaw as Claudius and Margaret Rawlings as Gertrude (5 & 15 December). Other post war productions included Richard II, directed by Royston Morley, and starring Alan Wheatley as Richard and Clement McCallin as Bolingbroke (29 October 1950); Henry V, again directed by Morley, and starring Clement McCallin as Henry and Olaf Pooley as The Dauphin (22 April 1951); an original Sunday Night Theatre production of The Taming of the Shrew, directed by Desmond Davis, and starring Margaret Johnston as Katherina and Stanley Baker as Petruchio (20 April 1952); a TV version of John Barton's Elizabethan Theatre Company production of Henry V, starring Colin George as Henry and Michael David as The Dauphin (19 May 1953); a Sunday Night Theatre live performance of Lionel Harris' musical production of The Comedy of Errors, starring David Pool as Antipholus of Ephesus and Paul Hansard as Antipholus of Syracuse (16 May 1954); and The Life of Henry the Fifth, the inaugural programme of BBC's new World Theatre series, directed by Peter Dews, and starring John Neville as Henry and John Wood as The Dauphin (29 December 1957).

There were also four multi-part made-for-TV Shakespearean adaptations shown during the 1950s and 1960s; three specifically conceived as TV productions, one a TV adaptation of a stage production. The first was The Life and Death of Sir John Falstaff (1959). Produced and directed by Ronald Eyre, and starring Roger Livesey as Falstaff, the series took all of the Falstaff scenes from the Henriad and adapted them into seven thirty-minute episodes. The second was An Age of Kings (1960). Produced by Peter Dews and directed by Michael Hayes, the show comprised fifteen episodes between sixty and eighty minutes each, which adapted all eight of Shakespeare's sequential history plays (Richard II, 1 Henry IV, 2 Henry IV, Henry V, 1 Henry VI, 2 Henry VI, 3 Henry VI and Richard III). The third was The Spread of the Eagle (1963), directed and produced by Dews. Featuring nine sixty-minute episodes, the series adapted the Roman plays, in chronological order of the real life events depicted; Coriolanus, Julius Caesar and Antony and Cleopatra. The fourth series was not an original TV production, but a made-for-TV "re-imagining" of a stage production; The Wars of the Roses, which was screened in both 1965 and 1966. The Wars of the Roses was a three-part adaptation of Shakespeare's first historical tetralogy (1 Henry VI, 2 Henry VI, 3 Henry VI and Richard III) which had been staged to great critical and commercial success at the Royal Shakespeare Theatre in 1963, adapted by John Barton, and directed by Barton and Peter Hall. At the end of its run, the production was remounted for TV, shot on the actual Royal Shakespeare Theatre stage, using the same set as the theatrical production, but not during live performances. Directed for television by Michael Hayes and Robin Midgley, it originally aired in 1965 as a three parter, just as the plays had been staged (the three parts were called Henry VI, Edward IV and Richard III). Due to the popularity of the 1965 broadcast, the series was again screen in 1966, but the three plays were divided up into ten episodes of fifty minutes each.

Although An Age of Kings, which was the most expensive and ambitious Shakespearean production up to that point, was a critical and commercial success, The Spread of the Eagle was not, and afterwards, the BBC decided to return to smaller scale productions with less financial risk. In 1964, for example, they screened a live performance of Clifford Williams' Royal Shakespeare Company (RSC) production of The Comedy of Errors from the Aldwych Theatre, starring Ian Richardson as Antipholus of Ephesus and Alec McCowen as Antipholus of Syracuse. 1964 also saw the broadcast of Hamlet at Elsinore, directed by Philip Saville and produced by Peter Luke. Starring Christopher Plummer as Hamlet, Robert Shaw as Claudius and June Tobin as Gertrude, the entire play was shot on-location in Helsingør at the real Elsinore Castle. In 1970, they screened The Tragedy of Richard II, sourced from Richard Cottrell's touring production, and starring Ian McKellen as Richard and Timothy West as Bolingbroke.

Additionally, the Play of the Month series had screened several Shakespearean adaptations over the years; Romeo and Juliet (1967), The Tempest (1968), Julius Caesar (1969), Macbeth (1970), A Midsummer Night's Dream (1971), The Merchant of Venice (1972), King Lear (1975) and Love's Labour's Lost (1975).

Funding
The BBC Television Shakespeare project was the most ambitious engagement with Shakespeare ever undertaken by either a television or film production company. So large was the project that the BBC could not finance it alone, requiring a North American partner who could guarantee access to the United States market, deemed essential for the series to recoup its costs. In their efforts to source this funding, the BBC met with some initial good luck. Cedric Messina's script editor, Alan Shallcross, was the cousin of Denham Challender, executive officer of the New York branch of Morgan Guaranty Trust. Challender knew that Morgan were looking to underwrite a public arts endeavour, and he suggested the Shakespeare series to his superiors. Morgan contacted the BBC, and a deal was quickly reached. However, Morgan was only willing to invest about one-third of what was needed (approximately £1.5 million/$3.6 million). Securing the rest of the necessary funding took the BBC considerably longer – almost three years.

Exxon were the next to invest, offering another third of the budget in 1976. The following year, Time Life, the BBC's US distributor, was contacted by the Corporation for Public Broadcasting (CPB) about possible investment in the project. However, because CPB used public funding, its interest in the series caught the attention of US labour unions and theatre professionals, who objected to the idea of US money subsidising British programming. The American Federation of Television and Radio Artists (AFTRA) and the American Federation of Labor and Congress of Industrial Organizations (AFL-CIO) began to put pressure on CPB not to invest in the series. Joseph Papp, director of the New York Shakespeare Festival, was particularly aghast, arguing that US television could do the entire canon for TV just as easily as the BBC, and publicly urging CPB not to invest. Before the situation came to a head, however, the necessary third investor was found, Metropolitan Life. Their investment meant that with the $5.5 million invested by the BBC, plus the money from Morgan and Exxon, the project was fully funded.

The complexity of this funding is indicated by the general opening credits for the US screening of each episode; "The series is made possible by grants from Exxon, Metropolitan Life, and Morgan Bank. It is a BBC-TV and Time/Life television co-production, presented for the Public Broadcasting Service by WNET/Thirteen, New York." According to Jac Venza, executive producer at WNET, "it was one of the few times that we got three separate corporate funders to agree to funding something six years into the future. That was in itself a kind of extraordinary feat."

Rejected plans
One of Messina's earliest decisions regarding the series was to hire a literary advisor; Professor John Wilders of Worcester College, Oxford. Wilders initially wanted the shows to work from completely new texts re-edited from the various quartos, octavos and folios specifically for the productions, but when the time necessary for this proved impractical, Wilders decided instead to use Peter Alexander's 1951 edition of the Complete Works as the series "bible."

At first, Messina envisioned the series as having six seasons of six episodes each, the plan being to adapt the three Henry VI plays into a two-part episode. This idea was quickly rejected, however, as it was felt to be an unacceptable compromise and it was instead decided to simply have one season with seven episodes. Initially, Messina toyed with the idea of shooting the plays in the chronological order of their composition, but this plan was abandoned because it was felt that doing so would necessitate the series beginning with a run of relatively little known plays, not to mention the fact that there is no definitive chronology. Instead, Messina, Wilders and Shallcross decided that the first season would comprise some of the better known comedies (Much Ado About Nothing and As You Like It) and tragedies (Romeo & Juliet and Julius Caesar). Measure for Measure was selected as the season's "obscure" play, and King Richard the Second was included to begin the eight-part sequence of history plays. When the production of the inaugural episode, Much Ado About Nothing, was abandoned after it had been shot, it was replaced by The Famous History of the Life of King Henry the Eight as the sixth episode of the season.

Almost immediately, however, the concept for the historical octology ran into trouble. Messina had wanted to shoot the eight sequential history plays in chronological order of the events they depicted, with linked casting and the same director for all eight adaptations (David Giles), with the sequence spread out over the entire six season run. During the early planning stages for King Richard the Second and The First Part of King Henry the Fourth however, the plan for linked casting fell apart, when it was discovered that although Jon Finch (Henry Bolingbroke in Richard) could return as Henry IV, Jeremy Bulloch as Hotspur and David Swift as the Earl of Northumberland were unable to do so, and the parts would have to be recast, thus undermining the concept of shooting the plays as one sequence. Ultimately, during the first season, King Richard the Second, although still directed by Giles, was treated as a stand-alone piece, whilst The First Part of King Henry the Fourth, The Second Part of King Henry the Fourth and The Life of Henry the Fift (all also directed by Giles) were treated as a trilogy during the second season, with linked casting between them. Additionally, in an attempt to establish a connection with the first season's Richard, Jon Finch returned as Henry IV, and The First Part of King Henry the Fourth opened with the murder of Richard from the previous play. The second set of four plays were then directed by Jane Howell as one unit, with a common set and linked casting, airing during the fifth season.

Another early idea, which never came to fruition, was the concept of forming a single repertory acting company to perform all thirty-seven plays. The RSC, however, were not especially pleased with this idea, as it saw itself as the national repertory. However, before the plan could be put into practice, the British Actors' Equity Association blocked the proposal, arguing that as many of its members as possible should get the chance to appear in the series. They also wrote into their contract with the BBC that only British and Irish actors could be cast. During the planning for season two, when it came to their attention that Messina was trying to cast James Earl Jones as Othello, Equity threatened to have their members strike, thus crippling the series. This forced Messina to abandon the casting of Jones, and Othello was pushed back to a later season.

Realism
Messina's initial aesthetic concept for the series was realism, especially in terms of the sets, which were to be as naturally representational as possible. This was based upon what Messina knew of TV audiences and their expectations. His opinion, supported by many of his staff, was that the majority of the audience would not be regular theatregoers who would respond to stylisation or innovation. Speaking of the Romeo & Juliet set, Henry Fenwick notes that

Indeed, two of the first-season episodes were recorded on location; As You Like It in and around Glamis Castle, and The Famous History of the Life of King Henry the Eight in three different castles in Kent.

However, despite the insistence on realism, both of the initial episodes, Romeo & Juliet and King Richard the Second, featured obviously fake, newly constructed studio-bound sets which were much criticised by reviewers for failing to achieve any sense of lived-in reality; "such half-realism repeatedly belies the very verisimilitude that was its goal." The scathing reviews of the early sets led to the series adopting an even more realistic approach in future adaptations, especially in productions such as Twelfth Night, The Merry Wives of Windsor and Cymbeline, all of which feature "a credible studio verisimilitude of exteriors, of places that work like filming on location rather than in a somewhat realistic stage or studio set." However, not everyone was a fan of the more extreme realistic aesthetic. John Wilders, for example, preferred the "fake realism" of the first plays, which he felt were "much more satisfactory than location work because the deliberate artificiality of the scenery works in harmony with the conventions of the plays. Unfortunately, it may create the impression that we have tried to build realistic sets but have failed for want of skill or money." This is exactly the impression it had created and was why later episodes featured far more elaborate sets, and why realism had been jettisoned as the over-riding stylistic approach by the time of Hamlet, Prince of Denmark at the end of the second season. When Jonathan Miller took over as producer at the start of season three, realism ceased to be a priority.

UK publicity
Prior to the screening of the first episode, UK publicity for the series was extensive, with virtually every department at the BBC involved. Once the series had begun, a major aspect of the publicity campaign involved previews of each episode for the press prior to its public broadcast, so reviews could appear before the episode aired; the idea being that good reviews might get people to watch who otherwise would not. Other publicity 'events' included a party to celebrate the commencement of the third season, at The George Inn, Southwark, near the site of the Globe Theatre, and a similar party at the start of the sixth season, in Glamis Castle, which was attended by Ian Hogg, Alan Howard, Joss Ackland, Tyler Butterworth, Wendy Hiller, Patrick Ryecart and Cyril Cusack, all of whom were on hand for interviews by the many invited journalists.

Another major aspect of the promotional work was supplementary educational material. For example, the BBC had their books division issue the scripts for each episode, prepared by script editor Alan Shallcross (seasons 1 and 2) and David Snodin (seasons 3 and 4) and edited by John Wilders. Each publication included a general introduction by Wilders, an essay on the production itself by Henry Fenwick, interviews with the cast and crew, photographs, a glossary, and annotations on textual alterations by Shallcross, and subsequently Snodin, with explanations as to why certain cuts had been made.

As well as the published annotated scripts, the BBC also produced two complementary shows designed to help viewers engage with the plays on a more scholarly level; the radio series Prefaces to Shakespeare and the TV series Shakespeare in Perspective. Prefaces was a series of thirty-minute shows focused on the performance history of each play, with commentary provided by an actor who had performed the play in the past. He or she would discuss the general stage history, as well as their own experiences working on the play, with each episode airing on BBC Radio 4 one to three nights prior to the screening of the actual episode on BBC 2.

The TV supplement, Shakespeare in Perspective, was a more generally educational show, with each twenty-five-minute episode dealing with various aspects of the production, hosted by various well-known figures, who, generally speaking, were not involved in Shakespeare per se. Aired on BBC 2 the night before the transmission of the show itself, the main intention of the series was "to enlighten a new audience for Shakespeare on television, attract people to the plays and give them some background material. [The presenters] encapsulated the stories of the plays, provided an historical framework, where feasible, and offer some original thoughts which might intrigue those already familiar with the text." The level of scholarship was purposely gauged for O and A-level exams, with presenters writing their own scripts. However, the series often ran into trouble. For the show on Hamlet, Prince of Denmark, for example, when the crew turned up to shoot, the presenter stated simply, "This is one of the silliest plays ever written, and I have nothing to say about it." This prompted a hastily organised program hosted by Clive James.

The biggest problem with Perspective, however, and the one most frequently commented upon in reviews, was that the presenter of each episode had not seen the production about which he/she was speaking, and often, there was a disparity between their remarks and the interpretation offered by the show. For example, poet Stephen Spender's comments about The Winter's Tale being a play of great beauty which celebrates the cycles of nature seemed at odds with Jane Howell's semi-stylised single-set production, where a lone tree was used to represent the change in seasons. The most commented upon example of this disparity was in relation to Cymbeline, which was hosted by playwright and screenwriter Dennis Potter. In his review for The Observer of both the production and the Perspective show, Julian Barnes wrote "several furlongs understandably separate the left hand of the BBC from the right one. Only rarely, though, do we witness such a cameo of intermanual incomprehension as occurred last week within their Shakespeare cycle: the right hand seizing a hammer and snappishly nailing the left hand to the arm of the chair." Barnes points out that clearly, Potter had not seen the show when recording his commentary. He was correct; Potter's Perspective had been recorded before Cymbeline had even been shot. According to Barnes,

US publicity

In the US, the BBC hired Stone/Hallinan Associates to handle publicity. However, because the show aired on public television, many US newspapers and magazines would not cover it. To launch the show in the US, a reception was held at the White House, attended by Rosalynn Carter, followed by lunch at the Folger Shakespeare Library. The main representative was Anthony Quayle, who had been cast as Falstaff for the second season Henry the Fourth episodes. It also helped that, unlike many of the other actors appearing in early episodes, Quayle was well known in the US. Also in attendance were Richard Pasco, Celia Johnson, Patrick Ryecart and Helen Mirren. James Earl Jones was initially scheduled to appear, in anticipation of the second season production of Othello, but by the time of the reception, Messina had been forced to abandon casting him. In the weeks leading up to the premier, Stone/Hallinan sent out press kits for each episode, whilst Exxon produced TV and radio commercials, and MetLife held Shakespearean open days in its head office, and sent out posters and viewer guides for each episode.

In the US, WNET planned a series of thirty-minute programs to act as general introductions to each episode. This created something of a media circus when they (half) jokingly asked Joseph Papp if he would be interested in hosting it. Ultimately, however, they abandoned the idea and simply aired the BBC's Shakespeare in Perspective episodes. In terms of radio publicity, in 1979, National Public Radio (NPR) aired Shakespeare Festival; a series of operas and music programs based on Shakespeare's plays, as well as a two-hour docudrama, William Shakespeare: A Portrait in Sound, written and directed by William Luce, and starring Julie Harris and David Warner. They also broadcast a lecture series from the Lincoln Center, featuring Samuel Schoenbaum, Maynard Mack and Daniel Seltzer. Additionally, NPR station WQED-FM aired half-hour introductions to each play the week before the TV broadcast of the episode. However, when the early episodes of the show did not achieve the kind of ratings which had been initially hoped, financing for publicity quickly dried up; a Shakespeare variety show planned for PBS in 1981, set to star Charlton Heston, Robin Williams, Richard Chamberlain and Chita Rivera, failed to find an underwriter and was cancelled. The Folger Shakespeare Library's Shakespeare: The Globe and the World, a multimedia touring exhibition, was more successful and travelled to cities all over the country for the first two seasons of the show.

Much as the UK promotional efforts by the BBC focused at least partially on education, so too did US publicity, where the underwriters spent as much on the educational material as they did on underwriting the series itself. The job of handling the US educational outreach program was given to Tel-Ed, a subsidiary of Stone/Hallinan. Educational efforts were focused on middle school and high school, which is when US students first encounter Shakespeare. Tel-Ed had a three-pronged goal; to make students familiar with more plays (most schools taught only Romeo and Juliet, Julius Caesar and Macbeth), to encourage students to actually enjoy Shakespeare, and to have Shakespeare taught more frequently. Tel-Ed's aim was to make the entire series available to every high-school in the US. During the first season, they sent out 36,000 educational packs to English departments, receiving 18,000 requests for further information. The educational aspect of the series was considered such a success that when the show went off the air in 1985, Morgan Bank continued with educational efforts, creating The Shakespeare Hour in 1986. The concept of the show was that episodes of the BBC Television Shakespeare would be presented specifically as educational tools. Planned as a three-year show with five episodes per year over a fifteen-week season, the series would group plays together thematically. Walter Matthau was hired as host, and each episode featured documentary material intercut with extensive clips from the BBC productions themselves. A book was also published with the full transcript of each episode; The Shakespeare Hour: A Companion to the PBS-TV Series, edited by Edward Quinn. In all, the first season cost $650,000, but everyone expected it to be a success. Covering the theme of love, it used A Midsummer Night's Dream, Twelfth Night, All's Well That Ends Well, Measure for Measure and King Lear. However, the show achieved very poor ratings and was cancelled at the end of the first season. The second season had been set to cover power (King Richard the Second, The First Part of King Henry the Fourth, The Tragedy of Richard III, The Taming of the Shrew, Macbeth and Julius Caesar), with the third looking at revenge (The Merchant of Venice, Hamlet, Prince of Denmark, The Winter's Tale, The Tempest and Othello).

Scheduling
The scope of the series meant that from the very beginning, scheduling was a major concern. Everyone knew that achieving good ratings for thirty-seven episodes over six years was not going to be easy, and to ensure this could be accomplished, the BBC were (at first) rigorous about the show's schedule. Each of the six seasons was to be broadcast in two sections; three weekly broadcasts in late winter, followed by a short break, and then three weekly broadcasts in early spring. This was done so as to maximise marketing in the lead up to Christmas, and then capitalise on the traditionally quiet period in early spring. The first season followed this model perfectly, with broadcasts in 1978 on 3 December (Romeo & Juliet), 10 December (King Richard the Second) and 17 December (Measure for Measure), and in 1979 on 11 February (As You Like It), 18 February (Julius Caesar) and 25 February (The Famous History of the Life of King Henry the Eight). All episodes were broadcast on BBC 2 on a Sunday, and all began at eight o'clock, with a five-minute interval around 9 for News on 2 and a weather report. The second season began with the same system, with productions in 1979 on 9 December (The First Part of King Henry the Fourth), 16 December (The Second Part of King Henry the Fourth) and 23 December (The Life of Henry the Fift). However, the schedule then began to run into problems. The fourth episode, Twelfth Night was shown on Sunday, 6 January 1980, but the fifth episode, The Tempest was not shown until Wednesday, 27 February, and the sixth, Hamlet, Prince of Denmark (which had been held up because of Derek Jacobi's schedule) did not air until Sunday, 25 May.

Moving into the third season, under Jonathan Miller's producership, the scheduling, as was commented upon by many critics at the time, seemed nothing short of random. Episode one of season three (The Taming of the Shrew) aired on Wednesday, 23 October 1980. The following episode (The Merchant of Venice) aired on Wednesday, 17 December, followed by All's Well on Sunday, 4 January 1981, The Winter's Tale on Sunday, 8 February, Timon of Athens on Thursday, 16 April and Antony & Cleopatra on Friday, 8 May. Miller's second season as producer (the show's fourth season) was even more erratic, with only three episodes appearing during the entire season; Othello on Sunday, 4 October 1981, Troilus & Cressida on Saturday, 7 November and A Midsummer Night's Dream on Sunday, 13 December. The next group of episodes did not air until the fifth season in September 1982, under Shaun Sutton's producership. Sutton's scheduling, if anything, was even more random than Miller's; the fifth season began with King Lear on Sunday, 19 September, but this was not followed until The Merry Wives of Windsor on Tuesday, 28 December. The first historical tetralogy temporarily regularised the schedule, and was aired on successive Sundays; 2, 9, 16 and 23 January 1983. The sixth season began with Cymbeline on Sunday, 10 July, but the second episode did not follow until Saturday, 5 November (Macbeth). The Comedy of Errors aired on Saturday, 24 December, followed only three days later by The Two Gentlemen of Verona on Tuesday, 27 December, with The Tragedy of Coriolanus bringing the season to a close on Saturday, 21 April 1984. Season seven aired entirely on Saturdays; The Life and Death of King John on 24 November, Pericles, Prince of Tyre on 8 December, Much Ado About Nothing on 22 December, Love's Labour's Lost on 5 January 1985, and finally Titus Andronicus on 27 April.

US scheduling was even more complex. In the UK, each episode could start at any time and run for any length without any major problems, because shows are not trimmed to fit slots; rather slots are arranged to fit shows. In the US however, TV worked on very rigid time slots; a show could not run, say, 138 minutes, it must run either 120 or 150 minutes to fit into the existing slot. Additionally, whereas the BBC included an intermission of five minutes roughly halfway through each show, PBS had to have an intermission every sixty minutes. Several of the shows in the first season left 'gaps' in the US time slots of almost twenty minutes, which had to be filled with something. In seasons one and two, any significant time gaps at the end of a show were filled by Renaissance music performed by the Waverly Consort. When Jonathan Miller took over as producer at the end of the second season, WNET suggested something different; each episode should have a two-minute introduction, followed by interviews with the director and a cast member at the end of the episode, which would be edited to run however long, was necessary to plug the gaps. However, moving into season five, WNET had no money left to record any more introductions or interviews, and the only alternative was to actually cut the episodes to fit the time slots, much to the BBC's chagrin. The productions that caused the most trouble were Jane Howell's Henry VI/Richard III series. Running a total of fourteen hours, WNET felt that airing the shows in four straight back-to-back segments would not work. First, they changed the schedule to air the episodes on Sunday afternoon as opposed to the usual Monday evening screening, then they divided the three Henry VI plays into two parts each. Finally, they cut a total of 77 minutes from the three productions (35 were taken from The Third Part of Henry the Sixt alone). In an effort to help trim The First Part of Henry the Sixt, much early dialogue was cut, and instead a voice over introduction recorded, ironically, by James Earl Jones was added, informing viewers of the necessary backstory. Strangely, however, The Tragedy of Richard III (the longest of the four) was aired as one piece, with only 3 minutes cut.

Production

Early restrictions
Because the US investors had put up so much money for the project, the backers were able to write aesthetic guidelines into the contract. However, as most of these guidelines conformed to Messina's vision of the series anyway ("to make solid, basic televised versions of Shakespeare's plays to reach a wide television audience and to enhance the teaching of Shakespeare"), they created no major problems. The most important of these stipulations was that the productions must be "traditional" interpretations of the plays set in either Shakespeare's time (1564 to 1616) or in the period of the events depicted (such as ancient Rome for Julius Caesar or c.1400 for Richard II). A two and a half-hour maximum running time was also mandated, although this was soon jettisoned when it became clear that the major tragedies in particular would suffer if truncated too heavily. The initial way around this was to split the longer plays into two sections, showing them on separate nights, but this idea was also discarded, and it was agreed that for the major plays, length was not an overly important issue.

The restriction regarding conservative, traditional interpretations was non-negotiable, however. The financiers were primarily concerned with ratings, and the restrictions worked to this end, ensuring the plays had "maximum acceptability to the widest possible audience." However, as practical a stipulation as this was, such decisions "demonstrate that far more concern was spent on financial matters than on interpretative or aesthetic issues in planning the series." Messina himself, however, had no problem with any of these restrictions, as they conformed to his initial vision; "we've not done anything too sensational in the shooting of it – there's no arty-crafty shooting at all. All of them are, for want of a better word, straightforward productions."

These restrictions had a practical origin, but they soon led to a degree of aesthetic fallout;

Partly because of this aesthetic credo, the series quickly developed a reputation for being overly conventional. As a result, when Miller would later try to persuade celebrated directors such as Peter Brook, Ingmar Bergman, William Gaskill and John Dexter to direct adaptations, he would fail. Reviewing the first two seasons of the series for Critical Quarterly, in an article entitled "BBC Television's Dull Shakespeares," Martin Banham quoted from a publicity extract written by Messina in which he stated "there has been no attempt at stylisation, there are no gimmicks; no embellishments to confuse the student." Banham opined that some of the best recent theatrical productions have been extremely "gimmicky" in the sense of "adventurous," whereas the opening two episodes of the series were simply "unimaginative" and more concerned with visual "prettiness" than dramatic quality.

In light of such criticism about the conservative nature of the early productions, Jac Venza defended the strictures, pointing out that the BBC was aiming to make programs with a long life span; they were not a theatre company producing a single run of plays for an audience already familiar with those plays, who would value novelty and innovation. They were making TV adaptations of plays for an audience the vast majority of whom would be unfamiliar with most of the material. Venza pointed out that many of the critics who most vehemently attacked the show's traditional and conservative nature were those who were regular theatre goers and/or Shakespearean scholars, and who were essentially asking for something the BBC never intended to produce. They wanted to reach a wide audience and get more people interested in Shakespeare, and as such, novelty and experimentation was not part of the plan, a decision Venza calls "very sensible."

Seasons 1 and 2 (Cedric Messina, producer)
Unfortunately for everyone involved in the series, production got off to the worst possible start. The inaugural episode was set to be Much Ado About Nothing, directed by Donald McWhinnie, and starring Penelope Keith and Michael York. The episode was shot (costing £250,000), edited and even publicly announced as the opening of the series, before it was suddenly pulled from the schedule and replaced with Romeo & Juliet (which was supposed to air as the second episode). No reasons were given by the BBC for this decision, although initial newspaper reports suggested that the episode had not been abandoned, it had simply been postponed for re-shoots, due to an unspecified actor's "very heavy accent," and concerns that US audiences would not be able to understand the dialogue. However, as time wore on, and no reshoots materialised, the press began to speculate that the show had been cancelled entirely, and would be replaced at a later date by a completely new adaptation, which was in fact what happened. The press also pointed out the fact that the production was never shown in Britain rubbished any suggestion that the prevailing cause for the abandonment was because of accents. Indeed, there is evidence to suggest that BBC management simply regarded the production as a failure. This issue, happening as it did at the very commencement of the series, would have lasting repercussions;

Another early problem for Messina was that the US publicity campaign for the show had touted the productions as "definitive" adaptations of Shakespeare's plays, prompting much criticism from theatre professionals, filmmakers and academics. The claim that the show would feature "definitive" productions was often raised and attacked by the US media during its seven-year run, especially when an episode did not live up to expectations.

From a practical point of view, during his tenure as producer, Messina was not overly involved in the actual taping of each episode. While he chose the director, assisted in the principal casting, attended some rehearsals, visited the set from time to time, and occasionally watched the editing, the director was responsible for the major aesthetic decisions – camera placement and movement, blocking, production design, costumes, music and editing.

Messina's legacy regarding the BBC Television Shakespeare can perhaps best be seen as something of a mixed bag; "what the initial Messina years cost the series in tensions, alienations, and lack of fresh thought or vigorous technical/aesthetic planning it would never recover. That we have the televised Shakespeare series at all is entirely due to Messina; that we have the Shakespeare series we have and not perhaps a better, more exciting one is also in large part due to Messina."

Seasons 3 and 4 (Jonathan Miller, producer)
During Messina's tenure as producer, as per the financiers' restrictions, the adaptations tended to be conservative, but when Jonathan Miller took over at the start of season three, he completely revamped things. On a superficial level, for example, he instituted a new title sequence and replaced William Walton's theme music with a newly composed piece by Stephen Oliver. Miller's changes went much deeper, however. Whereas Messina had favoured a realism-based approach, which worked to simplify the texts for audiences unfamiliar with Shakespeare, Miller was against any kind of aesthetic or intellectual dilution. Messina's theory was based on his many years of experience in television, and according to Martin Wiggins, it was exactly Miller's lack of such experience that led to his aesthetic overhaul of the show; Miller came from

Susan Willis makes a similar point; "instead of doing what the BBC usually did, Miller saw the series as a means of examining the limits of televised drama, of seeing what the medium could do; it was an imaginative, creative venture." Miller was in many ways the polar opposite of Messina;

Miller himself stated "I think it's very unwise to try to represent on the television screen something which Shakespeare did not have in his mind's eye when he wrote those lines. You have to find some counterpart of the unfurnished stage that Shakespeare wrote for without, in fact, necessarily reproducing a version of the Globe theatre. Because there's no way in which you can do that [...] What details you do introduce must remind the audience of the sixteenth century imagination." For Miller, the best way to do this was by using the work of famous artists as visual inspiration and reference points;

On this subject, Susan Willis writes

As this indicates, Miller adopted a visual and design policy of sets and costumes inspired by great paintings of the era in which the plays were written, although the style was dominated by the post-Shakespearean 17th century artists Vermeer and Rembrandt. In this sense, "art provides not just a look in Miller's productions; it provided a mode of being, a redolence of the air breathed in that world, an intellectual climate in addition to a physical space." This policy allowed other directors to stamp more of their own aesthetic credo on the productions than had been possible under Messina. According to Miller himself,

Speaking more directly, Elijah Moshinsky assessed Miller's contribution to the series by arguing that "it was only Miller's appointment that pulled the series out of its artistic nosedive." Speaking of the US restrictions, Miller stated "the brief was "no monkey-tricks" – but I think monkey-tricks is at least 50 percent of what interesting directing is about [...] The fact is that monkey-tricks are only monkey-tricks when they don't work. A monkey-trick that comes off is a stroke of genius. If you start out with a quite comprehensive self-denying ordinance of "no monkey-tricks," then you really are very much shackled." Similarly, speaking after he had stepped aside as producer at the end of the fourth season, Miller stated "I did what I wanted to do [...] The sponsors insisted that it was a traditional thing, that it didn't disturb people by bizarre setting. And I said, okay, fine, but, I'll disturb them with bizarre interpretations." Miller was not interested in stage tradition; he did not create a heroic Antony, a farcical Shrew or a sluttish Cressida. His Othello had little to do with race and his Lear was more of a family man than a regal titan. Miller himself spoke of his dislike for "canonical performances," stating "I think there is a conspiracy in the theatre to perpetuate certain prototypes in the belief that they contain the secret truth of the characters in question. This collusion between actors and directors is broken only by successful innovation which interrupts the prevailing mode."

The first episode shot under Miller's producership was Antony & Cleopatra (although the first to air would be The Taming of the Shrew), and it was in this episode, which he also directed, where he introduced his design policies, as he set about "permeating the design with the Renaissance view of the ancient world, for he observed that the Renaissance saw the classical world in terms of itself, with a contemporary rather than an archaeological awareness; they treated classical subjects but always dressed them anachronistically in Renaissance garments."

However, although there was definitely a new sense of aesthetic freedom with Miller as producer, this freedom could not be pushed too far. For example, when he hired Michael Bogdanov to direct Timon of Athens, Bogdanov proposed an Oriental themed modern-dress production. The financiers refused to sanction the idea, and Miller had to insist Bogdanov remain within the aesthetic guidelines. This led to Bogdanov quitting, and Miller himself taking over as director. One aspect of Messina's producership which Miller did reproduce was the tendency not to get too involved in the actual shooting of the productions which he was not directing. After appointing a director and choosing a cast, he would make suggestions and be on hand to answer questions, but his belief was that "the job of the producer is to make conditions as favourable and friendly as they possibly can be, so that [the directors'] imagination is given the best possible chance to work."

Seasons 5, 6 and 7 (Shaun Sutton, producer)
Whereas the BBC had looked for an outsider to inject fresh ideas into the project at the start of season three, they turned inwards once more in finding someone to bring the series to a conclusion; Shaun Sutton. Miller had rejuvenated the series aesthetically and his productions had saved its reputation with critics, but the show had fallen behind schedule, with Miller overseeing only nine episodes instead of twelve during his two-year producership. Sutton was brought in to make sure the show was completed without going too far over schedule. Officially, Sutton produced seasons five, six and seven, but in fact, he took over producership halfway through the filming of the Henry VI/Richard III tetralogy, which filmed from September 1981 to April 1982, and aired during season five in early 1983. Miller produced The First Part of Henry the Sixt and The Second Part of Henry the Sixt, Sutton produced The Third Part of Henry the Sixt and The Tragedy of Richard III. Sutton also produced the Miller directed King Lear, which was shot in March and April 1982, and aired as the season five opener in October 1982. As such, unlike the transition from Messina to Miller, the transition from Miller to Sutton was virtually unnoticeable.

At the start of season six, Sutton followed in Miller's footsteps by altering the opening of the show. He kept Miller's title sequence, but he dropped Stephen Oliver's theme music, and instead the music composed specifically for each episode served as the opening title music for that episode (except for The Two Gentlemen of Verona, which had no original music, so Oliver's theme music from seasons 3–5 was used).

When asked how he felt about Messina's time as producer, Sutton responded simply "I thought the approach was a little ordinary, and that we could do better." Sutton also continued with Messina and Miller's tendency to let the directors get on with the job;

The project was Sutton's retirement job after twelve years as the head of BBC Drama and he was under strict orders to bring the series to a close, something which he did successfully, with the broadcast of Titus Andronicus roughly twelve months later than the series had initially been set to wrap.

Reception
Messina's gamble in 1978 ultimately proved successful, as the series was a financial success, and by 1982 was already turning a profit.  This was primarily because of sales to foreign markets, with far more countries showing the series than was initially expected; as well as the UK and the US, the show was screened in Australia, Austria, the Bahamas, Bahrain, Barbados, Belgium, Bhutan, Bulgaria, Canada, Chile, China, Colombia, Czechoslovakia, Dubai, Egypt, France, Greece, Honduras, Hong Kong, Hungary, India, Iraq, Ireland, Italy, Jamaica, Japan, Jordan, Kenya, Korea, Lebanon, Malaysia, Mexico, the Netherlands, New Zealand, Panama, Peru, the Philippines, Poland, Portugal, Puerto Rico, Qatar, Romania, Saudi Arabia, Singapore, Spain, Sri Lanka, Taiwan, Thailand, Trinidad and Tobago, Turkey, Venezuela, West Germany and Yugoslavia.

Writing for the Los Angeles Times in 1985, Cecil Smith noted "the series has been the target of critical catcalls on both sides of the Atlantic, shabbily treated by many PBS stations, and often ignored or damned as dull, dull, dull." The early episodes in particular came in for criticism. Speaking of Romeo & Juliet, Clive James wrote in The Observer "Verona seemed to have been built on very level ground, like the floor of a television studio. The fact that this artificiality was half accepted, half denied, told you that you were not in Verona at all, but in that semi-abstract, semi-concrete, wholly uninteresting city which is known to students as Messina." Also speaking of Romeo & Juliet, The Daily Telegraphs Richard Last predicted, "the BBC Television Shakespeare will be, above all else, stylistically safe. Tradition and consolidation, rather than adventure or experiment, are to be the touchstones."

In his review of the first season for The Daily Telegraph, Sean Day-Lewis stated that Romeo & Juliet, As You Like It and Julius Caesar were unsuccessful, whilst King Richard the Second, Measure for Measure and The Famous History of the Life of King Henry the Eight were successful. However, even in the failures, he found qualities and as such, "it has not been a bad start, given some directors new to the problems of translating Shakespeare to television."

Reviewing the second season production of The Tempest for The Times Literary Supplement, Stanley Reynolds opined that although "there is very little for purists to find fault with [...] the most damning thing you could say about it [is] there is nothing to stir the blood to hot flashes of anger or to the electric joy of a new experience. What we got was some more of the BBC's ghastly middle taste."

As the series came to a close, Literary Reviews Andrew Rissik wrote "it must now be apparent as the BBC wind up their Shakespeare with Titus Andronicus – that the whole venture has been reckless and misguided [...] Messina's first productions were clumsy and unspecific, badly shot in the main and indifferently cast. Miller's productions were a clear improvement; their visual style was precise and distinctive and the casting, on the whole, intelligently done [...] But the series has not been a success." Speaking more bluntly, Michael Bogdanov called the series "the greatest disservice to Shakespeare in the last 25 years."

The series

Season 1

Romeo and Juliet
 Directed by Alvin Rakoff
 Produced by Cedric Messina
 Taping dates: 31 January-5 February 1978
 First transmitted in the UK: 3 December 1978
 First transmitted in the US: 14 March 1979
 Running time (PAL DVD) 168 minutes
Cast

Behind the scenes
Rebecca Saire was only fourteen when the production was filmed, an unusually young age for an actress playing Juliet, although the character is just thirteen. In interviews with the press prior to broadcast, Saire was critical of director Alvin Rakoff, stating that in his interpretation, Juliet is too childlike and asexual. This horrified the series' producers, who cancelled several scheduled interviews with the actress in the lead-up to broadcast.

The Prefaces to Shakespeare episode for Romeo & Juliet was presented by Peggy Ashcroft, who had played Juliet in a 1932 Oxford University Dramatic Society production directed by John Gielgud. The Shakespeare in Perspective episode was presented by feminist academic and journalist Germaine Greer.

King Richard the Second
 Directed by David Giles
 Produced by Cedric Messina
 Taping dates: 12–17 April 1978
 First transmitted in the UK: 10 December 1978
 First transmitted in the US: 28 March 1979
 Running time (PAL DVD): 157 minutes
Cast

Behind the scenes
This episode was repeated on 12 December 1979 in the UK and on 19 March 1980 in the US, as a lead-in to the Henry IV/Henry V trilogy. The Shakespeare in Perspective episode which introduced King Richard the Second was presented by historian Paul Johnson, who argued that the Henriad very much advanced the Tudor myth, something also argued by Graham Holderness who saw the BBC's presentation of the Henriad as "illustrating the violation of natural social 'order' by the deposition of a legitimate king."

Director David Giles shot the episode in such a way as to create a visual metaphor for Richard's position in relation to the court. Early in the production, he is constantly seen above the rest of the characters, especially at the top of stairs, but he always descends to the same level as everyone else, and often ends up below them. As the episode goes on, his positioning above characters becomes less and less frequent. An interpretative move by Giles which was especially well received by critics was his division of Richard's lengthy prison cell soliloquy up into a number of sections, which fade from one to another, suggesting a passage of time, and an ongoing slowly developing thought process.

The Prefaces to Shakespeare episode for King Richard the Second was hosted by Ian Richardson, who had starred in a 1974 RSC production directed by John Barton, in which he had alternated the roles of Richard and Bolingbroke with actor Richard Pasco.

As You Like It
 Directed by Basil Coleman
 Produced by Cedric Messina
 Taping dates: 30 May-16 June 1978
 First transmitted in the UK: 17 December 1978
 First transmitted in the US: 28 February 1979
 Running time (PAL DVD): 150 minutes
Cast

Behind the scenes
The production was shot at Glamis Castle in Scotland, one of only two productions shot on location, with the other being The Famous History of the Life of Henry the Eight. The location shooting received a lukewarm response from both critics and the BBC's own people, however, with the general consensus being that the natural world in the episode overwhelmed the actors and the story. Director Basil Coleman initially felt that the play should be filmed over the course of a year, with the change in seasons from winter to summer marking the ideological change in the characters, but he was forced to shoot entirely in May, even though the play begins in winter. This, in turn, meant the harshness of the forest described in the text was replaced by lush greenery, which was distinctly unthreatening, with the characters' "time in the forest appear[ing] to be more an upscale camping expedition rather than exile."

The Prefaces to Shakespeare episode for As You Like It was presented by Janet Suzman, who had played Rosalind in a 1967 RSC production directed by George Rylands. The Shakespeare in Perspective episode was presented by novelist Brigid Brophy.

Julius Caesar
 Directed by Herbert Wise
 Produced by Cedric Messina
 Taping dates: 26–31 July 1978
 First transmitted in UK: 11 February 1979
 First transmitted in the US: 14 February 1979
 Running time (PAL DVD): 161 minutes
Cast

Behind the scenes
Director Herbert Wise felt that Julius Caesar should be set in the Elizabethan era, but as per the emphasis on realism, he instead set it in a Roman milieu. Wise argued that the play "is not really a Roman play. It's an Elizabethan play and it's a view of Rome from an Elizabethan standpoint." Regarding setting the play in Shakespeare's day, Wise stated that, "I don't think that's right for the audience we will be getting. It's not a jaded theatre audience seeing the play for the umpteenth time: for them that would be an interesting approach and might throw new light on the play. But for an audience many of whom won't have seen the play before, I believe it would only be confusing."

The Prefaces to Shakespeare episode for Julius Caesar was presented by Ronald Pickup, who had played Octavius Caesar in a 1964 Royal Court Theatre production directed by Lindsay Anderson, and Cassius in a 1977 National Theatre production directed by John Schlesinger. The Shakespeare in Perspective episode was presented by political commentator Jonathan Dimbleby.

Measure for Measure
 Directed by Desmond Davis
 Produced by Cedric Messina
 Taping dates: 17–22 May 1978
 First transmitted in the UK: 18 February 1979
 First transmitted in the US: 11 April 1979
 Running time (PAL DVD): 145 minutes
Cast

Behind the scenes
The role of the Duke was originally offered to Alec Guinness. After he turned it down, the role was offered to a further thirty-one actors before Kenneth Colley accepted the part.

Director Desmond Davis based the brothel in the play on a traditional Western saloon and the prison on a typical horror film dungeon. The set for the episode was a 360-degree set backed by a cyclorama, which allowed actors to move from location to location without cutting – actors could walk through the streets of Vienna by circumnavigating the studio eight times. For the interview scenes, Davis decided to link them aesthetically and shot both in the same manner; Angelo was shot upwards from waist level to make him look large, Isabella was shot from further away so more background was visible in her shots, making her appear smaller. Gradually, the shots then move towards each other's style so that, by the end of the scene, they are both shot in the same framing.

The Prefaces to Shakespeare episode for Measure for Measure was presented by Judi Dench, who had played Isabella in a 1962 RSC production directed by Peter Hall. The Shakespeare in Perspective episode was presented by barrister and author Sir John Mortimer.

The Famous History of the Life of King Henry the Eight
 Directed by Kevin Billington
 Produced by Cedric Messina
 Taping dates: 27 November 1978 – 7 January 1979
 First transmitted in UK: 25 February 1979
 First transmitted in the US: 25 April 1979
 Running time (PAL DVD): 165 minutes
Cast

Behind the scenes
The second of only two episodes shot on location, after As You Like It. Whereas the location shooting in that episode was heavily criticised as taking away from the play, here, the location work was celebrated. The episode was shot at Leeds Castle, Penshurst Place and Hever Castle, in the actual rooms in which some of the real events took place. Director Kevin Billington felt that location shooting was essential to the production; "I wanted to get away from the idea that this is some kind of fancy pageant. I wanted to feel the reality. I wanted great stone walls [...] We shot at Hever Castle, where Anne Bullen lived; at Penhurst, which was Buckingham's place; and at Leeds Castle, where Henry was with Anne Bullen." Shooting on location had several benefits; the camera could be set up in such a way as to show ceilings, which cannot be done when shooting in a TV studio, as rooms are ceilingless to facilitate lighting. The episode was shot in winter, and on occasions, characters' breath can be seen, which was also impossible to achieve in studio. However, because of the cost, logistics and planning required for shooting on location, Messina decided that all subsequent productions would be done in-studio, a decision which did not go down well with several of the directors lined up for work on the second season.

This episode was not originally supposed to be part of the first season, but was moved forward in the schedule to replace the abandoned production of Much Ado About Nothing. It was repeated on 22 June 1981.

The Prefaces to Shakespeare episode for The Famous History of the Life of King Henry the Eight was presented by Donald Sinden, who had played Henry in a 1969 RCS production directed by Trevor Nunn. The Shakespeare in Perspective episode was presented by novelist and literary scholar Anthony Burgess.

Season 2

The First Part of King Henry the Fourth, with the life and death of Henry surnamed Hotspur
 Directed by David Giles
 Produced by Cedric Messina
 Taping dates: 7–12 March 1979
 First transmitted in the UK: 9 December 1979
 First transmitted in the US: 26 March 1980
 Running time (PAL DVD): 147 minutes
Cast

Behind the scenes
The week prior to the screening of this episode in both the UK and the US, the first-season episode King Richard the Second was repeated as a lead-in to the trilogy. The episode also began with Richard's death scene from the previous play.

The Prefaces to Shakespeare episode for The First Part of King Henry the Fourth was presented by Michael Redgrave who had played Hotspur in a 1951 RSC production directed by Anthony Quayle. The Shakespeare in Perspective episode was presented by musician, art historian and critic George Melly.

The Second Part of King Henry the Fourth containing his Death: and the Coronation of King Henry the Fift
 Directed by David Giles
 Produced by Cedric Messina
 Taping dates: 11–16 April 1979
 First transmitted in the UK: 16 December 1979
 First transmitted in the US: 9 April 1980
 Running time (PAL DVD): 150 minutes
Cast

Behind the scenes
This episode starts with a reprise of the death of Richard, followed by an excerpt from the first-season episode King Richard the Second. Rumour's opening soliloquy is then heard in voice-over, played over scenes from the previous week's The First Part of King Henry the Fourth; Henry's lamentation that he has not been able to visit the Holy Land, and the death of Hotspur at the hands of Prince Hal. With over a quarter of the lines from the Folio text cut, this production had more material omitted than any other in the entire series.

The Prefaces to Shakespeare episode for The Second Part of King Henry the Fourth was presented by Anthony Quayle who portrayed Falstaff in the BBC adaptation, and had also played the role several times on-stage, included a celebrated 1951 RSC production, which he directed with Michael Redgrave.  The Shakespeare in Perspective episode was presented by psychologist Fred Emery.

The Life of Henry the Fift
 Directed by David Giles
 Produced by Cedric Messina
 Taping dates: 18–25 June 1979
 First transmitted in the UK: 23 December 1979
 First transmitted in the US: 23 April 1980
 Running time (PAL DVD): 163 minutes
Cast

Behind the scenes
Director John Giles and production designer Don Homfray both felt this episode should look different from the two Henry IV plays. Whilst they had been focused on rooms and domestic interiors, Henry V was focused on large open spaces. As such, because they could not shoot on location, and because creating realistic reproductions of such spaces in a studio was not possible, they decided on a more stylised approach to production design than had hitherto been seen in the series. Ironically, the finished product looked more realistic that either of them had anticipated or desired.

Dennis Channon won Best Lighting at the 1980 BAFTAs for his work on this episode. The episode was repeated on Saint George's Day (23 April) in 1980.

The Prefaces to Shakespeare episode for The Life of Henry the Fift was presented by Robert Hardy who had played Henry V in the 1960 BBC television series An Age of Kings. The Shakespeare in Perspective episode was presented by politician Alun Gwynne Jones.

Twelfth Night
 Directed by John Gorrie
 Produced by Cedric Messina
 Taping dates: 16–21 May 1979
 First transmitted in the UK: 6 January 1980
 First transmitted in the US: 27 February 1980
 Running time (PAL DVD): 128 minutes
Cast

Behind the scenes
Director John Gorrie interpreted Twelfth Night as an English country house comedy, and incorporated influences ranging from Luigi Pirandello's play Il Gioco delle Parti to ITV's Upstairs, Downstairs. Gorrie also set the play during the English Civil War in the hopes the use of cavaliers and roundheads would help focus the dramatisation of the conflict between festivity and Puritanism. Gorrie wanted the episode to be as realistic as possible, and in designing Olivia's house, made sure that the geography of the building was practical. He then shot the episode in such a way that the audience becomes aware of the logical geography, often shooting characters entering and exiting doorways into rooms and corridors.

The Prefaces to Shakespeare episode for Twelfth Night was presented by Dorothy Tutin who had played Viola in a 1958 RSC production directed by Peter Hall. The Shakespeare in Perspective episode was presented by painter and poet David Jones.

The Tempest
 Directed by John Gorrie
 Produced by Cedric Messina
 Taping dates: 23–28 July 1979
 First transmitted in the UK: 27 February 1980
 First transmitted in the US: 7 May 1980
 Running time (PAL DVD): 124 minutes
Cast

Behind the scenes
The episode used a 360-degree set, which allowed actors to move from the beach to the cliff to the orchard without edits. The orchard was composed of real apple trees. The visual effects seen in this episode were not developed for use here. They had been developed for Top of the Pops and Doctor Who. John Gielgud was originally cast as Prospero, but contractual conflicts delayed the production, and by the time Messina had sorted them out, Gielgud was unavailable.

The Prefaces to Shakespeare episode for The Tempest was presented by Michael Hordern who portrayed Prospero in the BBC adaptation. The Shakespeare in Perspective episode was presented by philosopher Laurens van der Post.

Hamlet, Prince of Denmark
 Directed by Rodney Bennett
 Produced by Cedric Messina
 Taping dates: 31 January-8 February 1980
 First transmitted in the UK: 25 May 1980
 First transmitted in the US: 10 November 1980
 Running time (PAL DVD): 214 minutes
Cast

Behind the scenes
Originally, director Rodney Bennett had wanted to shoot the production on location, but after the first season, it was decreed that all productions were to be studio based. Bennett made a virtue of this restriction and his Hamlet, Prince of Denmark "was the first fully stylized production of the series." Bennett himself argued that "though on the face of it, Hamlet would seem to be a great naturalistic play, it isn't really [...] It has reality but it is essentially a theatrical reality. The way to do it is to start with nothing and gradually feed in only what's actually required." As such, the production design was open, with ambiguous space, openings without architectural specificity and emptiness. Susan Willis argues of this episode that it "was the first to affirm a theatre-based style rather than aspiring half-heartedly to the nature of film."

The episode was repeated in the US on 31 May 1982. The first screening was the highest rated production of the entire series in North America, with viewing figures of 5.5 million.

The Prefaces to Shakespeare episode for Hamlet, Prince of Denmark was presented by Derek Jacobi who portrayed Hamlet in the BBC adaptation. The Shakespeare in Perspective episode was presented by journalist Clive James.

Season 3

The Taming of the Shrew
 Directed by Jonathan Miller
 Produced by Jonathan Miller
 Taping dates: 18–24 June 1980
 First transmitted in the UK: 23 October 1980
 First transmitted in the US: 26 January 1981
 Running time (PAL DVD): 126 minutes
Cast

Behind the scenes

The production was at least partially based on Miller's own 1972 Chichester Festival stage production starring Joan Plowright and Anthony Hopkins, and as with all of the episodes Jonathan Miller directed, he allowed the work of celebrated artisans to influence his design concepts. In the case of Shrew, the street set was based on the work of architect Sebastiano Serlio, as well as the Teatro Olimpico, designed by Andrea Palladio. Baptista's living room was modelled closely on Vermeer's The Music Lesson.

The casting of John Cleese as Petruchio was not without controversy. Cleese had never performed Shakespeare before, and was not a fan of the first two seasons of the BBC Television Shakespeare. As such, he took some persuading from Miller that the BBC Shrew would not be, as Cleese feared "about a lot of furniture being knocked over, a lot of wine being spilled, a lot of thighs being slapped and a lot of unmotivated laughter." Miller told Cleese that the episode would interpret Petruchio as an early Puritan more concerned with attempting to show Kate how preposterous her behaviour is ("showing her an image of herself" as Miller put it), rather than bullying her into submission, and as such, the part was not to be acted along the traditional lines of the swaggering braggart a la Richard Burton in Franco Zeffirelli's 1967 film adaptation. According to Cleese, who consulted a psychiatrist who specialised in treating "shrews," "Petruchio doesn't believe in his own antics, but in the craftiest and most sophisticated way he needs to show Kate certain things about her behaviour. He takes one look at her and realises that here is the woman for him, but he has to go through the process of 'reconditioning' her before anything else. So he behaves just as outrageously as she does in order to make her aware of the effect that her behaviour has on other people [...] Kate needs to be made happy – she is quite clearly unhappy at the beginning of the play, and then extremely happy at the end because of what she has achieved with Petruchio's help." Miller also researched how troublesome children were treated at the Tavistock Clinic, where imitation was often used during therapy; "there are ways in which a skilful therapist will gently mock a child out of a tantrum by giving an amusing imitation of the tantrum immediately after its happened. The child then has a mirror held up to it and is capable of seeing what it looks like to others." In his review of the adaptation for the Financial Times, Chris Dunkley referred to this issue, calling Cleese's Petruchio "an eccentrically pragmatic social worker using the wayward client's own doubtful habits to calm her down." Actress Sarah Badel had a similar conception of the psychology behind the production. She constructed an "imaginary biography" for Katherina, arguing, "She's a woman of such passion [...] a woman of such enormous capacity for love that the only way she could be happy is to find a man of equal capacity. Therefore she's mad for lack of love [...] he feigns madness, she is teetering on the edge of it. Petruchio is the only man who shows her what she's like."

Miller was determined that the adaptation not become a farce, and in that vein, two keys texts for him during production were Lawrence Stone's The Family, Sex and Marriage in England: 1500–1800 and Michael Walzer's The Revolution of the Saints, which he used to help ground his interpretation of the play in recognisably Renaissance-esque societal terms; Petruchio's actions are based on accepted economic, social and religious views of the time, as are Baptista's. In tandem with this interpretation, the song sung at the end of the play is a musical version of Psalm 128 ("Blessed is everyone that feareth the Lord"), which was often sung in Puritan households at the end of a meal during Shakespeare's own day, and which praised a peaceful family life. Speaking of the addition of the psalm, Miller states "I had to give [the conclusion] an explicitly religious format, so people could see it as not just simply the high-jinks of an intolerantly selfish man who was simply destroying a woman to satisfy his own vanity, but a sacramental view of the nature of marriage, whereby this couple had come to love each other by reconciling themselves to the demands of a society which saw obedience as a religious requirement." Diana E. Henderson was unimpressed with this approach, writing, "it was the perfect production to usher in the neo-conservative 1980s" and "this BBC-TV museum piece unabashedly celebrates the order achieved through female submission."

This episode premiered the new opening title sequence, and the new theme music by Stephen Oliver.

The Prefaces to Shakespeare episode for The Taming of the Shrew was presented by Paola Dionisotti who had played Katherina in a 1978 RSC production directed by Michael Bogdanov. The Shakespeare in Perspective episode was presented by author and journalist Penelope Mortimer.

The Merchant of Venice
 Directed by Jack Gold
 Produced by Jonathan Miller
 Taping dates: 15–21 May 1980
 First transmitted in the UK: 17 December 1980
 First transmitted in the US: 23 February 1981
 Running time (PAL DVD): 157 minutes
Cast

Behind the scenes
Although this episode screened to little controversy in the UK, in the US, it created a huge furore. As soon as WNET announced the broadcast date, the Holocaust and Executive Committee (HEC) of the Committee to Bring Nazi War Criminals to Justice sent them a letter demanding the show be cancelled. WNET also received protest letters from the Anti-Defamation League (ADL) and B'nai B'rith. Additionally, Morris Schappes, editor of Jewish Currents, wrote an open letter of protest to The New York Times. The HEC stated that Shylock can arouse "the deepest hate in the pathological and prejudiced mind," urging WNET "that reason and a reputable insight into the psychopathology of man will impel you to cancel [the play's] screening." They later stated, "our objection is not to art but to the hate monger, whoever the target [...] This includes the singular and particular work of art which when televised is viewed by millions and alarmingly compounds the spread of hate." The ADL stated that screening the episode would be "providing a forum for a Shylock who would have warmed the heart of Nazi propagandist Julius Streicher." PBS and WNET issued a joint statement citing the protests of Saudi Arabians the previous year regarding the screening of Death of a Princess, a docudrama about the public execution of Princess Mishaal, and quoting PBS president Lawrence K. Grossman; "the healthy way to deal with such sensitivities is to air the concerns and criticism, not to bury or ban them." PBS and WNET also pointed out that both producer Jonathan Miller and actor Warren Mitchell are Jewish. For their part, Miller and director Jack Gold had anticipated the controversy, and prepared for it. In the Stone/Hallinan press material, Gold stated, "Shylock's Jewishness in dramatic terms is a metaphor for the fact that he, more than any other character in Venice, is an alien." Miller stated "it's not about Jews versus Christians in the racial sense; it's the world of legislation versus the world of mercy."

Director Jack Gold chose an unusual presentational method in this episode; completely realistic and authentic costumes, but a highly stylised non-representational set against which the characters contrast; "if you imagine different planes, the thing closest to the camera was the reality of the actor in a real costume – the costumes were totally real and very beautiful – then beyond the actor is a semi-artificial column or piece of wall, and in the distance is the backcloth, which is impressionistic." The backcloths were used to suggest locale without photographic representationalism; they imply air, water, sea, hills, a city, but never actually show anything specific.

Geoff Feld won Best Cameraman at the 1981 BAFTAs for his work on this episode.

The Prefaces to Shakespeare episode for The Merchant of Venice was presented by Timothy West who had played Shylock in a 1980 Old Vic production which he also directed. The Shakespeare in Perspective episode was presented by playwright and screenwriter Wolf Mankowitz.

All's Well That Ends Well
 Directed by Elijah Moshinsky
 Produced by Jonathan Miller
 Taping dates: 23–29 July 1980
 First transmitted in the UK: 4 January 1981
 First transmitted in the US: 18 May 1981
 Running time (PAL DVD): 142 minutes
Cast

Behind the scenes
In line with producer Jonathan Miller's aesthetic policy, director Elijah Moshinsky used the work of artists as visual influence. Of particular importance was Georges de La Tour. Moshinsky showed some of de La Tour's work to lighting technician John Summers, as he wanted to capture the dark/light contrast of the work, as well as the prominence of silhouettes and chiaroscuro effects common in the paintings. Summers loved this idea and worked it into his lighting. For example, he lit the scene where the widow agrees to Helena's wager as if it was illuminated by a single candle. To achieve this, he used a projector bulb hidden by objects on the table to simulate the sense of a single bright light source. Summers would go on to win Best Lighting at the 1981 BAFTAs for his work on this episode.

Moshinsky was also very careful about camera placement. The opening shot is a long shot of Helena, before eventually moving in to a close up. Of this opening, Moshinsky commented "I wanted to start with a long shot of Helena and not move immediately to close-up – I didn't want too much identification with her, I wanted a picture of a woman caught in an obsession, with the camera static when she speaks, clear, judging her words. I wanted to start with long shots because I felt they were needed to place people in their context and for the sake of atmosphere. I wanted the atmosphere to help carry the story." With the exception of one shot, every shot in the episode is an interior. The only exterior shot is that of Parolles as he passes the women looking out the window in Florence. The shot is framed in such a way, however, that none of the surroundings are seen. For the shot where the King and Helena dance into the great hall, the scene was shot through a pane of glass which had the ceiling and walls of the hall painted on it, to give the appearance of a much larger and grander room than was actually present. The idea for the scenes between the King and Helena to be so sexually charged was actor Donald Sinden's own.

Moshinsky has made contradictory statements about the end of the play. In the printed script, he indicated he felt that Bertram kissing Helena is a happy ending, but in press material for the US broadcast, he said he found the end to be sombre because none of the young characters had learnt anything.

The Prefaces to Shakespeare episode for All's Well That Ends Well was presented by Sebastian Shaw who had played the King of France in a 1968 RSC production directed by John Barton. The Shakespeare in Perspective episode was presented by comedian and television writer Barry Took.

The Winter's Tale
 Directed by Jane Howell
 Produced by Jonathan Miller
 Taping dates: 9–15 April 1980
 First transmitted in the UK: 8 February 1981
 First transmitted in the US: 8 June 1981
 Running time (PAL DVD): 173 minutes
Cast

Behind the scenes
As with all of Jane Howell's productions, this episode was performed on a single set. The change of the seasons, so critical to the movement of the play, is indicated by a lone tree whose leaves change colour as the year moves on, with the background a monochromatic cycloramic curtain, which changed colour in tune with the changing colour of the leaves.

The Prefaces to Shakespeare episode for The Winter's Tale was presented by Anna Calder-Marshall who portrayed Hermione in the BBC adaptation. The Shakespeare in Perspective episode was presented by poet and novelist Stephen Spender.

Timon of Athens
 Directed by Jonathan Miller
 Produced by Jonathan Miller
 Taping dates: 28 January-3 February 1981
 First transmitted in the UK: 16 April 1981
 First transmitted in the US: 14 December 1981
 Running time (PAL DVD): 128 minutes
Cast

Behind the scenes
Michael Bogdanov was originally hired to direct this episode, but he resigned after his Oriental modern-dress interpretation was considered too radical, and Jonathan Miller reluctantly took over directorial duties. In the episode, Timon's seaside camp is littered with debris; half buried statues and roofs of old houses from times past. This design concept stemmed from an idea Miller had originally had for Troilus and Cressida, which he was prepping when he took over Timon. The concept was that the Greek camp had been built on the ruins of old Troy, but now the remnants of the once buried city were beginning to surface from under the earth. For the scene when Timon loses his temper after the second banquet, actor Jonathan Pryce did not know how he wanted to play the scene, so Miller simply told him to improvise. This necessitated cameraman Jim Atkinson having to keep Pryce in shot without knowing beforehand where Pryce was going to go or what he was going to do. Only once, when Pryce seems as if he is about to bend over but then suddenly stops, did Atkinson lose Pryce from centre frame.

The Prefaces to Shakespeare episode for Timon of Athens was presented by Richard Pasco who had played Timon in a 1980 RSC production directed by Ron Daniels. The Shakespeare in Perspective episode was presented by journalist and satirist Malcolm Muggeridge.

Antony and Cleopatra
 Directed by Jonathan Miller
 Produced by Jonathan Miller
 Taping dates: 5–10 March 1980
 First transmitted in the UK: 8 May 1981
 First transmitted in the US: 20 April 1981
 Running time (PAL DVD): 170 minutes
Cast

Behind the scenes
Although this episode was the last this season episode to air, it was actually the first episode shot under Jonathan Miller's producership. He purposely interpreted it in a manner divergent from most theatrical productions. Whereas the love between Antony and Cleopatra is usually seen in a heightened manner, as a grand passion, Miller saw it as a love between two people well past their prime who are both on a "downhill slide, each scrambling to maintain a foothold". He compared Antony to a football player who had waited several seasons too long to retire, and Cleopatra to a "treacherous slut". Miller used Paolo Veronese's The Family of Darius before Alexander as a major influence in his visual design of this episode, as it mixes both classical and Renaissance costumes in a single image.

This is one of only two episodes in which original Shakespearean text was substituted with additional material (the other is Love's Labour's Lost). Controversially, Miller and his script editor David Snodin cut Act 3, Scene 10 and replaced it with the description of the Battle of Actium from Plutarch's Parallel Lives, which is delivered as an onscreen legend overlaying a painting of the battle.

During rehearsal of the scene with the snake, Jane Lapotaire, who suffers from ophidiophobia, was extremely nervous, but was assured the snake was well trained. At that point, the snake crawled down the front of her dress towards her breast, before then moving around her back. During the shooting of the scene, Lapotaire kept her hands on the snake at all times.

The Prefaces to Shakespeare episode for Antony & Cleopatra was presented by Barbara Jefford who had played Cleopatra in a 1965 Oxford Playhouse production directed by Frank Hauser. The Shakespeare in Perspective episode was presented by "agony aunt" Anna Raeburn.

Season 4

Othello
 Directed by Jonathan Miller
 Produced by Jonathan Miller
 Taping dates: 9–17 March 1981
 First transmitted in the UK: 4 October 1981
 First transmitted in the US: 12 October 1981
 Running time (PAL DVD): 203 minutes
Cast

Behind the scenes
Cedric Messina had planned to screen Othello during the second season, and had attempted to cast James Earl Jones in the part. However, the British Actors' Equity Association had written into their contract with the BBC that only British actors could appear in the series, and if Messina cast Jones, Equity threatened to strike, thus crippling the show. Messina backed down and Othello was pushed back to a later season. By the time it was produced, Jonathan Miller had taken over as producer, and he decided that the play was not about race at all, casting a white actor in the role.

During production, Miller based the visual design on the work of El Greco. The interior design of the production was based on the interiors of the Palazzo Ducale, Urbino, whilst the street set was based on a real street in Cyprus. For the scene where Iago asks Cassio about Bianca, Othello stands behind the open door. Most of the scene is shot from behind him, so the audience sees what he sees. However, not all the dialogue between Iago and Cassio is audible, which led to criticism when the episode was screened in the US, where it was assumed that the sound people simply had not done their job. It was, in fact, an intentional choice; if Othello is having difficulty hearing what they are saying, so too is the audience. Bob Hoskins played Iago as a Rumpelstiltskin type, an impish troublemaker who delights in petty mischief and mocks people behind their backs.

The Prefaces to Shakespeare episode for Othello was presented by Bob Peck who had played Iago in a 1979 RSC production directed by Ronald Eyre. The Shakespeare in Perspective episode was presented by author Susan Hill.

Troilus and Cressida
 Directed by Jonathan Miller
 Produced by Jonathan Miller
 Taping dates: 28 July-5 August 1981
 First transmitted in the UK: 7 November 1981
 First transmitted in the US: 17 May 1982
 Running time (PAL DVD): 190 minutes
Cast

Behind the scenes
Director Jonathan Miller used the work of gothic painter Lucas Cranach as primary visual influence during this production. Several of Cranach's sketches can be seen in Ajax's tent, most notably, Eve from his Adam and Eve woodcut, hung on the tent like a nude centrefold. Miller wanted Troy to be sharply differentiated from Greece; Troy was decadent, with clear abstract lines (based on some of Hans Vredeman de Vries' architectural experiments with perspective). Costumes were elegant and bright, based on the works of Cranach and Albrecht Dürer. The Greek camp, on the other hand, was based on a gypsy camp near the BBC Television Centre; cluttered, dirty and squalid. Miller envisioned it as built on the remains of an earlier Troy, with bits of roofs jutting out of the ground and bits and pieces of ancient statues lying around (although this idea originated for Troilus, Miller had first used it in his earlier Timon of Athens). Also, on one side of the camp, a huge wooden horse leg can be seen under construction – the Trojan Horse. In the command tent, a schematic for the horse is visible in several scenes, as is a scale model on the desk nearby. Miller wanted the camp to give the sense of "everything going downhill," with the men demoralised, fed up fighting, wanting only to get drunk and sleep (except Ulysses, who is depicted as still fully alert) The uniforms were all khaki coloured, and although Renaissance in style, were based on the TV show M*A*S*H, with Thersites specifically based on Corporal Klinger.

Of the play, Miller stated "it's ironic, it's farcical, it's satirical: I think it's an entertaining, rather frothily ironic play. It's got a bitter-sweet quality, rather like black chocolate. It has a wonderfully light ironic touch and I think it should be played ironically, not with heavy-handed agonising on the dreadful futility of it all." Miller chose to set the play in a Renaissance milieu rather than a classical one, as he felt it was really about Elizabethan England rather than ancient Troy, and as such, he hoped the production would carry relevance for a contemporary TV audience; "I feel that Shakespeare's plays and all the works of the classic rank, of literary antiquity, must necessarily be Janus-faced. And one merely pretends that one is producing pure Renaissance drama; I think one has to see it in one's own terms. Because it is constantly making references, one might as well be a little more specific about it. Now that doesn't mean that I want to hijack them for the purposes of making the plays address themselves specifically to modern problems. I think what one wants to do is to have these little anachronistic overtones so that we're constantly aware of the fact that the play is, as it were, suspended in the twentieth-century imagination, halfway between the period in which it was written and the period in which we are witnessing it. And then there is of course a third period being referred to, which is the period of the Greek antiquity."

Jim Atkinson won Best Cameraman at the 1982 BAFTAs for his work on this episode.

The Prefaces to Shakespeare episode for Troilus & Cressida was presented by Norman Rodway who had played Thersites in a 1968 RSC production directed by John Barton. The Shakespeare in Perspective episode was presented by diplomat Sir David Hunt.

A Midsummer Night's Dream
 Directed by Elijah Moshinsky
 Produced by Jonathan Miller
 Taping dates: 19–25 May 1981
 First transmitted in the UK: 13 December 1981
 First transmitted in the US: 19 April 1982
 Running time (PAL DVD): 111 minutes
Cast

Behind the scenes
Jonathan Miller planned on directing this episode himself, with fairies inspired by the work of Inigo Jones and Hieronymus Bosch, but he directed Timon of Athens instead, after original director Michael Bogdanov quit that production. Elijah Moshinsky based his fairies on the baroque eroticism of Rembrandt and Peter Paul Rubens; in particular Rembrandt's Danaë was used as the inspiration for Titania's bed. Fashioning a darker production than is usual for this play, Moshinsky referred to the style of the adaptation as "romantic realism." He disliked productions which portrayed Puck as a mischievous but harmless and lovable sprite, so he had Phil Daniels play him as if he were an anti-establishment punk. It has long been rumoured, but never confirmed, that in his portrayal of Peter Quince, actor Geoffrey Palmer was imitating the soon-to-retire Director General of the BBC, Ian Trethowan.

The Prefaces to Shakespeare episode for A Midsummer Night's Dream was presented by Frances de la Tour who had played Helena in a 1970 RSC production directed by Peter Brook. The Shakespeare in Perspective episode was presented by art historian Roy Strong.

Season 5

King Lear
 Directed by Jonathan Miller
 Produced by Shaun Sutton
 Taping dates: 26 March-2 April 1982
 First transmitted in the UK: 19 September 1982
 First transmitted in the US: 18 October 1982
 Running time (PAL DVD): 185 minutes
Cast

Behind the scenes
Originally, Cedric Messina had cast Robert Shaw to play Lear, with an aim to do the show during the second season, but Shaw died suddenly in 1978 before production could begin, and the play was pushed back. Jonathan Miller had previously directed a Nottingham Playhouse production of King Lear in 1969, starring Michael Hordern as Lear and Frank Middlemass as the Fool. In 1975, he remounted that same production for the BBC Play of the Month, a heavily truncated version, which happened to be the BBC's last Shakespeare production prior to the beginning of the Television Shakespeare. During his producership, Miller tried to persuade the BBC to use the Play of the Month production as their Lear, but they refused, saying a new production had to be done. At the end of the fourth season, Miller's last as producer, his contract stipulated that he still had one production to direct. In-coming producer Shaun Sutton offered him Love's Labour's Lost, but Miller wanted to do one of the three remaining tragedies; Lear, Macbeth or Coriolanus. He had never directed Macbeth or Coriolanus before, but he felt so comfortable with Lear that he went with it. The production was much the same as his 1969/1975 version, with the same two leading actors, the same costumes design, the same lighting, and the same design concept. The only significant difference is that more of the text is used in the latter production. Miller used a "board and drapes" approach to the play; all interiors were shot on or near a plain wooden platform whilst all exteriors were shot against a cycloramic curtain with dark tarpaulins. As such, although exteriors and interiors were clearly distinguished from one another, both were nonrepresentational. To enhance the starkness of the look of the production, Miller had lighting technician John Treays desaturate the colour by 30 per cent. Miller also used colour to connect characters; the Fool wears white makeup which washes off during the storm, Edgar wears a white mask when he challenges Edmund to fight, and Cordelia wears white make-up after her death. Similarly, the Fool has red feathers in his hat, Edgar has a red tunic, and Cordelia's red welts on her neck stand out starkly against the white of her skin after her death.

The Prefaces to Shakespeare episode for King Lear was presented by Tony Church who had played the Fool in a 1962 RSC production directed by Peter Brook. The Shakespeare in Perspective episode was presented by literary critic Frank Kermode.

The Merry Wives of Windsor
 Directed by David Jones
 Produced by Shaun Sutton
 Taping dates: 1–8 November 1982
 First transmitted in the UK: 28 December 1982
 First transmitted in the US: 31 January 1983
 Running time (PAL DVD): 167 minutes
Cast

Behind the scenes
Director David Jones wanted to shoot the episode in Stratford-upon-Avon but was restricted to a studio setting. Determined that the production be as realistic as possible, Jones had designer Dom Homfray base the set on real Tudor houses associated with Shakespeare; Falstaff's room is based on the home of Mary Arden (Shakespeare's mother) in Wilmcote, and the wives' houses are based on the house of Shakespeare's daughter Susanna, and her husband, John Hall. For the background of exterior shots, he used a miniature Tudor village built of plasticine. Homfray won Best Production Designer at the 1983 BAFTAs for his work on this episode.

Jones was determined that the two wives not be clones of one another, so he had them appear as if Page was a well-established member of the bourgeoisie and Ford a member of the nouveau riche.

The Prefaces to Shakespeare episode for The Merry Wives of Windsor was presented by Prunella Scales who portrayed Mistress Page in the BBC adaptation. The Shakespeare in Perspective episode was presented by novelist Jilly Cooper.

The First Part of Henry the Sixt
 Directed by Jane Howell
 Produced by Jonathan Miller
 Taping dates: 13–19 October 1981
 First transmitted in the UK: 2 January 1983
 First transmitted in the US: 27 March and 3 April 1983
 Running time (PAL DVD): 188 minutes
Cast

Behind the scenes

Inspired by the notion that the political intrigues behind the Wars of the Roses often seemed like playground squabbles, Howell and production designer Oliver Bayldon staged the four plays in a single set resembling a children's adventure playground. However, little attempt was made at realism. For example, Bayldon did not disguise the parquet flooring ("it stops the set from literally representing [...] it reminds us we are in a modern television studio"), and in all four productions, the title of the play is displayed within the set itself (on banners in The First Part and The Second Part (where it is visible throughout the entire first scene), on a shroud in The Third Part, and written on a chalkboard by Richard himself in The Tragedy of Richard III). Many critics felt these set design choices lent the production an air of Brechtian verfremdungseffekt. Stanley Wells wrote of the set that it was intended to invite the viewer to "accept the play's artificiality of language and action." Michael Hattaway describes it as "anti-illusionist." Susan Willis argues it allows the productions "to reach theatrically toward the modern world." Ronald Knowles writes, "a major aspect of the set was the subliminal suggestion of childlike anarchy, role-playing, rivalry, game and vandalism, as if all culture were precariously balanced on the shaky foundations of atavistic aggression and power-mad possession."

Another element of verfremdungseffekt in this production is seen when Gloucester and Winchester encounter one another at the Tower; both are on horseback, but the horses they ride are hobbyhorses, which actors David Burke and Frank Middlemass cause to pivot and prance as they speak. The ridiculousness of this situation works to "effectively undercut their characters' dignity and status." The "anti-illusionist" set was also used as a means of political commentary; as the four plays progressed, the set decayed and became more and more dilapidated as social order becomes more fractious. In the same vein, the costumes become more and more monotone as the four plays move on – The First Part of Henry the Sixt features brightly coloured costumes which clearly distinguish the various combatants from one another, but by The Tragedy of Richard III, everyone fights in similarly coloured dark costumes, with little to differentiate one army from another.

Graham Holderness saw Howell's non-naturalistic production as something of a reaction to the BBC's adaptation of the Henriad in seasons one and two, which had been directed by David Giles in a traditional and straightforward manner; "where Messina saw the history plays conventionally as orthodox Tudor historiography, and [David Giles] employed dramatic techniques which allow that ideology a free and unhampered passage to the spectator, Jane Howell takes a more complex view of the first tetralogy as, simultaneously, a serious attempt at historical interpretation, and as a drama with a peculiarly modern relevance and contemporary application. The plays, to this director, are not a dramatization of the Elizabethan World Picture but a sustained interrogation of residual and emergent ideologies in a changing society [...] This awareness of the multiplicity of potential meanings in the play required a decisive and scrupulous avoidance of television or theatrical naturalism: methods of production should operate to open the plays out, rather than close them into the immediately recognisable familiarity of conventional Shakespearean production."

Howell's presentation of the complete first historical tetralogy was one of the most lauded achievements of the entire BBC series, and prompted Stanley Wells to argue that the productions were "probably purer than any version given in the theatre since Shakespeare's time." Michael Mannheim was similarly impressed, calling the tetralogy "a fascinating, fast paced and surprisingly tight-knit study in political and national deterioration."

The Prefaces to Shakespeare episode for The First Part of Henry the Sixt was presented by Brewster Mason who had played Warwick in the 1963 RSC production The Wars of the Roses directed by John Barton and Peter Hall. The Shakespeare in Perspective episode was presented by historian Michael Wood.

The Second Part of Henry the Sixt
 Directed by Jane Howell
 Produced by Jonathan Miller
 Taping dates: 17–23 December 1981
 First transmitted in the UK: 9 January 1983
 First transmitted in the US: 10 and 17 April 1983
 Running time (PAL DVD): 213 minutes
Cast

Behind the scenes

This episode was filmed on the same set as The First Part of Henry the Sixt. However, designer Oliver Bayldon altered the set so it would appear that the paint work was flaking and peeling, and the set falling into a state of disrepair, as England descended into an ever-increasing state of chaos. In the same vein, the costumes became more and more monotone as the four plays went on; The First Part of Henry the Sixt features brightly coloured costumes which clearly distinguish the various combatants from one another, but by The Tragedy of Richard III, everyone fights in similarly coloured dark costumes, with little to differentiate one army from another.

A strong element of verfremdungseffekt in this production is the use of doubling, particularly in relation to actors David Burke and Trevor Peacock. Burke plays Henry's most loyal servant, Gloucester, but after Gloucester's death, he plays Jack Cade's right-hand man, Dick the Butcher. Peacock plays Cade himself, having previously appeared in The First Part of Henry the Sixt as Lord Talbot, representative of the English chivalry so loved by Henry. Both actors play complete inversions of their previous characters, re-creating both an authentically Elizabethan theatrical practice and providing a Brechtian political commentary.

Howell's presentation of the complete first historical tetralogy was one of the most lauded achievements of the entire BBC series, and prompted Stanley Wells to argue that the productions were "probably purer than any version given in the theatre since Shakespeare's time." Michael Mannheim was similarly impressed, calling the tetralogy "a fascinating, fast paced and surprisingly tight-knit study in political and national deterioration."

The Prefaces to Shakespeare episode for The Second Part of Henry the Sixt was presented by Brewster Mason who had played Warwick in the 1963 RSC production The Wars of the Roses directed by John Barton and Peter Hall. The Shakespeare in Perspective episode was presented by historian Michael Wood.

The Third Part of Henry the Sixt
 Directed by Jane Howell
 Produced by Shaun Sutton
 Taping dates: 10–17 February 1982
 First transmitted in the UK: 16 January 1983
 First transmitted in the US: 24 April and 1 May 1983
 Running time (PAL DVD): 211 minutes
Cast

Behind the scenes

This episode was filmed on the same set as The First Part of Henry the Sixt and The Second Part of Henry the Sixt. However, designer Oliver Bayldon altered the set so it would appear to be falling apart, as England descended into an even worse state of chaos. In the same vein, the costumes became more and more monotone as the four plays went on – The First Part of Henry the Sixt features brightly coloured costumes which clearly distinguish the various combatants from one another, but by The Tragedy of Richard III, everyone fights in similarly coloured dark costumes, with little to differentiate one army from another.

The scene where Richard kills Henry has three biblical references carefully worked out by Howell: as Richard drags Henry away, his arms spread out into a crucified position; on the table at which he sat are seen bread and wine; and in the background, an iron crossbar is illuminated against the black stone wall.

Howell's presentation of the complete first historical tetralogy was one of the most lauded achievements of the entire BBC series, and prompted Stanley Wells to argue that the productions were "probably purer than any version given in the theatre since Shakespeare's time." Michael Mannheim was similarly impressed, calling the tetralogy "a fascinating, fast paced and surprisingly tight-knit study in political and national deterioration."

The Prefaces to Shakespeare episode for The Third Part of Henry the Sixt was presented by Brewster Mason who had played Warwick in the 1963 RSC production The Wars of the Roses directed by John Barton and Peter Hall. The Shakespeare in Perspective episode was presented by historian Michael Wood.

The Tragedy of Richard III
 Directed by Jane Howell
 Produced by Shaun Sutton
 Taping dates: 31 March-6 April 1982
 First transmitted in the UK: 23 January 1983
 First transmitted in the US: 2 May 1983
 Running time (PAL DVD): 239 minutes
Cast

Behind the scenes

This episode was filmed on the same set as the three Henry VI plays. However, designer Oliver Bayldon altered the set so it would appear to be a ruin, as England reached its lowest point of chaos. In the same vein, the costumes became more and more monotone as the four plays went on; The First Part of Henry the Sixt features brightly coloured costumes which clearly distinguish the various combatants from one another, but by The Tragedy of Richard III, everyone fights in similarly coloured dark costumes, with little to differentiate one army from another.

As this version of Richard III functioned as the fourth part of a series, it meant that much of the text usually cut in standalone productions could remain. The most obvious beneficiary of this was the character of Margaret, whose role, if not removed completely, is usually truncated. Textual editor David Snodin was especially pleased that a filmed version of Richard III was finally presenting Margaret's full role. Director Jane Howell also saw the unedited nature of the tetralogy as important for Richard himself, arguing that without the three Henry VI plays "it is impossible to appreciate Richard except as some sort of diabolical megalomaniac," whereas in the full context of the tetralogy "you've seen why he is created, you know how such a man can be created: he was brought up in war, he saw and knew nothing else from his father but the struggle for the crown, and if you've been brought up to fight, if you've got a great deal of energy, and physical handicaps, what do you do? You take to intrigue and plotting."

The production is unusual amongst filmed Richards insofar as no one is killed on camera, other than Richard himself. This was a conscious choice on the part of Howell; "you see nobody killed; just people going away, being taken away – so much like today; they're just removed. There's a knock on the door and people are almost willing to go. There's no way out of it."

Controversially, the episode ended with Margaret sitting atop a pyramid of corpses (played by all of the major actors who had appeared throughout the tetralogy) cradling Richard's dead body and laughing manically, an image Edward Burns refers to as "a blasphemous pietà." Howell herself referred to it as a "reverse pietà," and defended it by arguing that the tetralogy is bigger than Richard III, so to end by simply showing Richard's death and Richmond's coronation is to diminish the roles that have gone before; the vast amount of death that has preceded the end of Richard III cannot be ignored. R. Chris Hassel Jr. remarks of this scene that "our last taste is not the restoration of order and good governance, but of chaos and arbitrary violence." Hugh M. Richmond says the scene gives the production a "cynical conclusion," as "it leaves our impressions of the new King Henry VII's reign strongly coloured by Margaret's malevolent glee at the destruction of her enemies that Henry has accomplished for her."

Howell's presentation of the complete first historical tetralogy was one of the most lauded achievements of the entire BBC series, and prompted Stanley Wells to argue that the productions were "probably purer than any version given in the theatre since Shakespeare's time." Michael Mannheim was similarly impressed, calling the tetralogy "a fascinating, fast paced and surprisingly tight-knit study in political and national deterioration."

At 239 minutes, this production was the longest episode in the entire series, and when the series was released on DVD in 2005, it was the only adaptation split over two disks. Of the 3,887 lines comprising the First Folio text of the play, Howell cut only 72; roughly 1.8% of the total.

The Prefaces to Shakespeare episode for The Tragedy of Richard III was presented by Edward Woodward who had played Richard in a 1982 Ludlow Festival production directed by David William. The Shakespeare in Perspective episode was presented by novelist Rosemary Anne Sisson.

Season 6

Cymbeline
 Directed by Elijah Moshinsky
 Produced by Shaun Sutton
 Taping dates: 29 July-5 August 1982
 First transmitted in the UK: 10 July 1983
 First transmitted in the US: 20 December 1982
 Running time (PAL DVD): 174 minutes
Cast

Behind the scenes
From this episode on, the show featured no unique theme music; the opening titles were scored with music composed specifically for the episode; although the new title sequence introduced by Miller at the start of the third season continued to be used.

During the episode, the battle between the Romans and the Britons is never shown on screen; all that is seen is a single burning building, intended to indicate the general strife; we never see the defeat of Iachimo, Posthumus sparing him or Iachimo's reaction. Moshinsky did not want to expunge the political context of the play, but he was not especially interested in the military theme, and so removed most of it, with an aim to focus instead on the personal. Moshinsky shot the scene of Iachimo watching the sleeping Imogen in the same way as he shot the scene of Imogen finding Cloten in bed beside her; as Iachimo leaves the room, the camera is at the head of the bed, and as such, Imogen appears upside-down in frame. Later, when she awakes to find the headless Cloten, the scene begins with the camera in the same position, with Imogen once again upside-down; "the inverted images visually bind the perverse experiences, both nightmarish, both sleep related, both lit by one candle." Moshinsky used Rembrandt's portrait of Agatha Bas as inspiration for Imogen's costume.

The Prefaces to Shakespeare episode for Cymbeline was presented by Jeffery Dench, who had played Cymbeline in a 1979 RSC production directed by David Jones. The Shakespeare in Perspective episode was presented by dramatist and journalist Dennis Potter.

Macbeth
 Directed by Jack Gold
 Produced by Shaun Sutton
 Taping dates: 22–28 June 1982
 First transmitted in the UK: 5 November 1983
 First transmitted in the US: 17 October 1983
 Running time (PAL DVD): 147 minutes
Cast

Behind the scenes
This episode was shot with a 360-degree cycloramic backcloth in the background which could be used as representative of a general environment, with much use made of open space.

The Prefaces to Shakespeare episode for Macbeth was presented by Sara Kestelman who had played Lady Macbeth in a 1982 RSC production directed by Howard Davies. The Shakespeare in Perspective episode was presented by crime writer and poet Julian Symons.

The Comedy of Errors
 Directed by James Cellan Jones
 Produced by Shaun Sutton
 Taping dates: 3–9 November 1983
 First transmitted in the UK: 24 December 1983
 First transmitted in the US: 20 February 1984
 Running time (PAL DVD): 109 minutes
Cast

Behind the scenes

Director James Cellan Jones felt very strongly that the play was not just a farce, but included a serious side, specifically represented by the character of Aegeon, who has lost his family and is about to lose his life. In several productions Jones had seen, Aegeon was completely forgotten between the first and last scenes, and determined to avoid this, and hence give the production a more serious air, Jones had Aegeon wandering around Ephesus throughout the episode.

This production used editing and special effects to have each set of twins played by the same actors. However, this was not well received by critics, who argued that not only was it confusing for the audience as to which character was which, but much of the comedy was lost when the characters look identical.

The entire production takes place on a stylised set, the floor of which is a giant map of the region, shown in its entirety in the opening and closing aerial shots; all of the main locations (the Porpentine, the Abbey, the Phoenix, the market etc.) are located in a circular pattern around the centre map.

The Prefaces to Shakespeare episode for The Comedy of Errors was presented by Roger Rees who had played Antipholus of Syracuse in a 1976 RSC production directed by Trevor Nunn. The Shakespeare in Perspective episode was presented by comedian Roy Hudd.

The Two Gentlemen of Verona
 Directed by Don Taylor
 Produced by Shaun Sutton
 Taping dates: 25–31 July 1983
 First transmitted in the UK: 27 December 1983
 First transmitted in the US: 23 April 1984
 Running time (PAL DVD): 136 minutes
Cast

Behind the scenes

The music in this episode was created by Anthony Rooley, who wrote new arrangements of works from Shakespeare's own time, such as John Dowland's piece 'Lachrimae'. Performed by The Consort of Musicke, other musicians whose music was used include William Byrd, Thomas Campion, Anthony Holborne, John Johnson, Thomas Morley and Orazio Vecchi. As no original music was used, Stephen Oliver's theme from seasons three to five was used for the opening titles.

Director Don Taylor initially planned a representational setting for the film; Verona, Milan and the forest were all to be realistic. However, he changed his mind early in preproduction and had production designer Barbara Gosnold go in the opposite direction, choosing a stylised setting. To this end, the forest is composed of metal poles with bits of green tinsel and brown sticks stuck to them (the cast and crew referred to the set as "Christmas at Selfridges"). Whilst the set for Verona was more realistic, that for Milan featured young extras dressed like cherubs. This was to convey the idea that the characters lived in a "Garden of Courtly Love", slightly divorced from everyday reality. Working in tandem with this idea, upon Proteus' arrival in Milan, after meeting Silvia, he is left alone on stage, and the weather suddenly changes from calm and sunny to cloudy and windy, accompanied by a thunderclap. The implication being that Proteus has brought a darkness within him into the garden of courtly delights previously experienced by Silvia.

Although the production is edited in a fairly conventional manner, much of it was shot in extremely long takes, and then edited into sections, rather than actually shooting in sections. Taylor would shoot most of the scenes in single takes, as he felt this enhanced performances and allowed actors to discover aspects which they never would were everything broken up into pieces.

The Prefaces to Shakespeare episode for The Two Gentlemen of Verona was presented by Geoffrey Hutchings who had played Launce in a 1969 RSC production directed by Gareth Morgan. The Shakespeare in Perspective episode was presented by journalist Russell Davies.

The Tragedy of Coriolanus
 Directed by Elijah Moshinsky
 Produced by Shaun Sutton
 Taping dates: 18–26 April 1983
 First transmitted in the UK: 21 April 1984
 First transmitted in the US: 26 March 1984
 Running time (PAL DVD): 145 minutes
Cast

Behind the scenes
The production design of Rome in this episode was very specific; everywhere except the Senate was to be small and cramped. The idea behind this design choice was to reflect Coriolanus' mindset. He dislikes the notion of the people gathering together for anything, and on such a cramped set, because the alleys and streets are so small, it only takes a few people to make them look dangerously crowded. When Caius Marcius fights the Coriolian soldiers, he leaves his shirt on, but when he fights Aufidius in one-on-one combat, he takes it off. Moshinsky did this to give the scene an undercurrent of homoeroticism. In the script for the episode, Coriolanus' death scene is played as a fight between himself and Aufidius in front of a large crowd who urge Aufidius to kill him. However, in shooting the scene, Moshinsky changed it so that it takes place in front of a few silent senators, and there is, as such, no real fight.

The Prefaces to Shakespeare episode for The Tragedy of Coriolanus was presented by Ian Hogg who had played Coriolanus in a 1972 RSC production directed by Trevor Nunn. The Shakespeare in Perspective episode was presented by General Sir John Hackett.

Season seven; Shaun Sutton, producer

The Life and Death of King John
 Directed by David Giles
 Produced by Shaun Sutton
 Taping dates: 1–7 February 1984
 First transmitted in the UK: 24 November 1984
 First transmitted in the US: 11 January 1985
 Running time (PAL DVD): 157 minutes
Cast

Behind the scenes
For this production, director David Giles chose to go with a stylised setting, which he referred to as both "emblematic" and "heraldic." The music was written by Colin Sell. Leonard Rossiter died before the show aired.

The Prefaces to Shakespeare episode for The Life and Death of King John was presented by Emrys James who had played John in a 1974 RSC production directed by John Barton and Barry Kyle. The Shakespeare in Perspective episode was presented by chairman of the British Railways Board Peter Parker.

Pericles, Prince of Tyre
 Directed by David Jones
 Produced by Shaun Sutton
 Taping dates: 21–28 June 1983
 First transmitted in the UK: 8 December 1984
 First transmitted in the US: 11 June 1984
 Running time (PAL DVD): 177 minutes
Cast

Behind the scenes
Director David Jones used long shots in this episode to try to create the sense of a small person taking in a vast world. Annette Crosbie thought of Dionyza as an early version of Alexis Colby, Joan Collins' character in Dynasty.

The Prefaces to Shakespeare episode for Pericles, Prince of Tyre was presented by Amanda Redman who portrayed Marina in the BBC adaptation. The Shakespeare in Perspective episode was presented by poet and journalist P.J. Kavanagh.

Much Ado About Nothing
 Directed by Stuart Burge
 Produced by Shaun Sutton
 Taping dates: 15–21 August 1984
 First transmitted in the UK: 22 December 1984
 First transmitted in the US: 30 October 1984
 Running time (PAL DVD): 148 minutes
Cast

Behind the scenes
The inaugural episode of the entire series was originally set to be a production of Much Ado About Nothing, directed by Donald McWhinnie, and starring Penelope Keith and Michael York. The episode was shot (for £250,000), edited and even publicly announced as the opening of the series, before it was suddenly pulled from the schedule and replaced with Romeo & Juliet, originally intended as the second episode. No reasons were given by the BBC for this decision, although initial newspaper reports suggested that the episode had not been abandoned, but postponed for reshoots, due to an unspecified actor's "very heavy accent," and concerns that US audiences would not be able to understand the dialogue. However, no reshoots materialised, and the press began to speculate that the show had been cancelled entirely, and would be replaced at a later date by a new adaptation, which was, in fact, what happened. The press also pointed out that the fact that the production was never shown in Britain undermined the suggestion that the cause of the abandonment was to do with accents. Indeed, there is evidence to suggest that BBC management simply regarded the production as a failure.

During the reshoot for the seventh season, director Stuart Burge considered shooting the entire episode against a blank tapestry background, with no set whatsoever, but it was felt that audiences would not respond well to this, and the idea was scrapped. Ultimately the production used "stylized realism"; the environments are suggestive of their real life counterparts, the foregrounds are broadly realistic representations, but the backgrounds tended to be more artificial; "a representational context close to the actors, with a more stylized presentation of distance."

Jan Spoczynski won Designer of the Year at the 1985 Royal Television Society Awards for his work on this episode.

The Prefaces to Shakespeare episode for Much Ado About Nothing was presented by Kenneth Haigh who had played Benedick in a 1976 Royal Exchange Theatre production directed by Braham Murray. The Shakespeare in Perspective episode was presented by actress Eleanor Bron.

Love's Labour's Lost
 Directed by Elijah Moshinsky
 Produced by Shaun Sutton
 Taping dates: 30 June-6 July 1984
 First transmitted in the UK: 5 January 1985
 First transmitted in the US: 31 May 1985
 Running time (PAL DVD): 120 minutes
Cast

Behind the scenes

Director Elijah Moshinsky used the paintings of Jean-Antoine Watteau, especially his use of fête galante in pictures such as L'Embarquement pour Cythère, the music of Wolfgang Amadeus Mozart and the writing of Pierre de Marivaux as inspiration during the making of this episode, which is the only play of the thirty-seven to be set in the eighteenth century. Of the play, Moshinsky said, "it has the atmosphere of Marivaux – which is rather delicious, and yet full of formalised rules between men and women, sense against sensibility; there's a distinction between enlightenment and feeling. I think the atmosphere of Watteau's paintings suits this enormously well and gives it a lightness of touch. And also it abstracts it; we don't want anything too realistic because the whole thing is a kind of mathematical equation – four men for four women – and the play is testing certain propositions about love." To ensure that the image match the fête galante style, Moshinsky had lighting technician John Summers use floor lighting as opposed to the usual method of ceiling lighting for some of the exterior scenes, also shooting through a very light gauze to create a softness in line and colour.

For Moshinsky, the central episode of the production is the play-within-the-play in the final scene which is interrupted by the arrival of Marcade, an episode to which Moshinsky refers as "an astonishing sleight of hand about reality and the reflection of experiencing reality." He argues that the audience is so wrapped up in watching the characters watch the pageant that they have forgotten reality, and the arrival of Marcade with news of the death of the King of France jolts the audience back to reality in the same way it jolts the eight main characters. In this sense, Moshinsky sees the play more as about artifice and reality than romantic relationships.

This was one of only two productions which replaced original dialogue with material from outside the play (the other was Jonathan Miller's Anthony & Cleopatra). Here, in an invented scene set between Act 2 Scene 1 and Act 3, Scene 1, Berowne is shown drafting the poem to Rosaline, which will later be read by Nathaniel to Jacquenetta. The lines in this invented scene (delivered in voice-over) are taken from the fifth poem of the William Jaggard publication The Passionate Pilgrim, a variant of Berowne's final version of his own poem.

This was the only production that John Wilders, the series literary advisor, criticised publicly. Specifically, he objected to the character of Moth being portrayed by an adult actor.

The Prefaces to Shakespeare episode for Love's Labour's Lost was presented by Kenneth Branagh who had played Navarre in a 1984 RSC production directed by Barry Kyle. The Shakespeare in Perspective episode was presented by novelist Emma Tennant.

Titus Andronicus
 Directed by Jane Howell
 Produced by Shaun Sutton
 Taping dates: 10–17 February 1985
 First transmitted in the UK: 27 April 1985
 First transmitted in the US: 19 April 1985
 Running time (PAL DVD): 167 minutes
Cast

Behind the scenes

As Titus was broadcast several months after the rest of the seventh season, it was rumoured that the BBC were worried about the violence in the play and that disagreements had arisen about censorship. This was inaccurate, however, with the delay caused by a BBC strike in 1984. The episode had been booked into the studio in February and March 1984, but the strike meant it could not shoot. When the strike ended, the studio could not be used as it was being used by another production, and then when the studio became available, the RSC was using Trevor Peacock. Thus filming did not take place until February 1985, a year later than planned.

Director Jane Howell had toyed with the idea of setting the play in a contemporary Northern Ireland, but settled on a more conventional approach. All the body parts seen throughout were based upon real autopsy photographs, and were authenticated by the Royal College of Surgeons. The costumes of the Goths were based on punk outfits, with Chiron and Demetrius specifically based on the band KISS. For the scene when Chiron and Demetrius are killed, a large carcass is seen hanging nearby; this was a genuine lamb carcass purchased from a kosher butcher and smeared with Vaseline to make it gleam under the studio lighting. In an unusual design choice, Howell had the Roman populace all wear identical generic masks without mouths, so as to convey the idea that the Roman people were faceless and voiceless, as she felt the play depicted a society which "seemed like a society where everyone was faceless except for those in power." In the opening scene, as the former emperor's body is carried out, only Saturninus and Bassianus take their masks away from their faces, no one else, and they do so only to glare at one another.

In a significant departure from the text, Howell set Young Lucius as the centre of the production so as to prompt the question "What are we doing to the children?" At the end of the play, as Lucius delivers his final speech, the camera stays on Young Lucius rather than his father, who is in the far background and out of focus, as he stares in horror at the coffin of Aaron's child (which has been killed off-screen). Thus the production became "in part about a boy's reaction to murder and mutilation. We see him losing his innocence and being drawn into this adventure of revenge; yet, at the end we perceive that he retains the capacity for compassion and sympathy."

The Prefaces to Shakespeare episode for Titus Andronicus was presented by Patrick Stewart who had played Titus in a 1981 RSC production directed by John Barton. The Shakespeare in Perspective episode was presented by psychiatrist Anthony Clare.

Omissions and changes
All line references are taken from the individual Oxford Shakespeare editions of each play.
 The Taming of the Shrew
 The Induction and the interjection of Christopher Sly at the end of 1.1 are absent.
 Several lines are omitted from the conversation between Grumio and Curtis in 4.1
 The brief conversation between Biondello and Lucentio which opens 5.1 is absent.
 5.2 ends differently from the play. The last line spoken is Petruchio's "We three are married, but you two are sped;" thus omitting Petruchio's comment to Lucentio "'Twas I won the wager, though you hit the white,/And being a winner, God give you good night," as well as Hortensio's line, "Now go thy ways, thou has tamed a curst shrew," and Lucentio's closing statement, Tis a wonder, by your leave, she will be tamed so." Additionally, Petruchio and Katherina do not leave the banquet prior to the end of the play, but remain, and engage in a song with all present.
 The First Part of Henry the Sixt
 Lines are omitted from almost every scene. Some of the more notable omissions include, in 1.1, Bedford's references to children crying and England becoming a marsh since Henry V died (ll.48–51). In 1.2, Alençon's praise of the resoluteness of the English army is absent (ll.29–34). In 1.5, Talbot's complaint about the French wanting to ransom him for a prisoner of less worth is absent (ll.8–11). In 1.7, some of Charles' praise of Joan is absent (ll.21–27). In 4.6, some of the dialogue between Talbot and John is absent (ll.6–25). In 4.7, twelve of Joan's sixteen lines are cut; the entire seven line speech where she says John Talbot refused to fight her because she is a woman (ll.37–43), the first three lines of her five line mockery of Lucy's listing of Talbot's titles (ll.72–75), and the first two lines of her four line speech where she mocks Lucy as he is about to take over Talbot's position (ll.86–88).
 The adaptation opens differently from the text, as we see Henry VI singing a lament for his father.
 Fastolf's escape from Rouen is seen rather than merely mentioned.
 5.1 and 5.2 are reversed so that 4.7 and 5.2 now form one continuous piece.
 The Duke of Burgundy is seen to be killed prior to Joan's capture; in the text, his fate is unknown.
 The character of Warwick as portrayed by Mark Wing-Davey is Richard Neville, 16th Earl of Warwick. In the play however, the character is Richard de Beauchamp, 13th Earl of Warwick, Neville's father-in-law.
 The Second Part of Henry the Sixt
 Lines are omitted from almost every scene. Some of the more notable omissions include, in 1.1, both of Humphrey's references to Bedford are absent (ll. 82–83, 95–96), as is the reference to Suffolk's demands that he be paid for escorting Margaret from France (ll. 131–133), and York's allusion to Althaea and Calydon in his closing soliloquy (ll.231–235). York's outline of Edward III's seven sons is absent from 2.2 (ll.10–17), as is Salisbury's reference to Owen Glendower (l.41). Suffolk's accusation that Humphrey was involved in necromancy with Eleanor is omitted from 3.1 (ll.47–53), as is Humphrey's outline of how he dealt with criminals during his time as Lord Protector (ll.128–132). Also absent from 3.1 is York's reference to how he fought alongside Cade in Ireland (ll.360–370). In 4.1, all references to Walter Whitmore's name as Gualtier are absent. The entirety of 4.5 (a brief scene showing Lord Scales and Matthew Gough on patrol at the Tower of London) is absent. In 5.1, some of the dialogue between Clifford and Warwick is absent (ll.200–210).
 Some lines have also been added to the play. In 1.1, two lines are added to Salisbury's vow to support York if he can prove he is a legitimate heir to the crown; "The reverence of mine age and the Neville's name/Is of no little force if I command" (added between ll.197 and 198). In 1.3, two lines are added to the conversation between Margaret and Thump, where Thump mistakes the word 'usurper' for 'usurer' and is corrected by Margaret (between ll.31 and 32). In 2.1, the conversation between Humphrey and Beaufort is extended, wherein Humphrey says that Beaufort was born "in bastardy." All of these additional lines are taken from the 1594 quarto of the play, The First part of the Contention betwixt the two famous Houses of Yorke and Lancaster.
 Several lines are spoken by characters other than who speak in the Folio text. In 1.3, Humphrey's line "This is the law and this Duke Humphrey's doom" is given to Henry. In 1.4, during the conjuration, there is no separate spirit in the scene; all the spirit's dialogue is spoken 'through' Magarey Jourdayne. Also, later in this scene, it is Buckingham who reads the prophecies, not York. In 4.1, the second half of line 139 ("Pompey the Great and Suffolk dies by pirates") is given to the Lieutenant.
 The character of George Plantagenet is introduced towards the end of the play, just prior to the Battle of St Albans, with which the play closes. In the text however, George is not introduced until 3 Henry VI, 2.2.
 The character of Buckingham is killed onscreen. In the play, his fate is unknown, and it is only revealed in the opening lines of 3 Henry VI that he had been killed by Edward.
 The play ends slightly differently from the directions in the text. After the battle, the victorious House of York leave the stage, all except Salisbury, who sadly looks around the field of battle at the many dead bodies.
 The Third Part of Henry the Sixt
 Lines are omitted from almost every scene. Some of the more notable omissions include the opening twenty-four lines of the first scene. Instead the play begins with Warwick proclaiming, "This is the palace of the fearful king." Also in 1.1, all references to Margaret chairing a session of parliament are absent (ll.35–42), as are her references to the pains of childbirth, and Henry's shameful behaviour in disinheriting his son (ll.221–226). Absent from 1.3 is Rutland's appeal to Clifford's paternal instincts (ll.41–43). In 2.1, all references to Clarence's entry into the conflict are absent, as he had already been introduced as a combatant at the end of The Second Part of Henry VI. During the debate between the Yorkists and the Lancastrians in 2.2, Richard's "Northumberland, I hold thee reverentially" is absent (l.109). In 3.3, Warwick's reference to Salisbury's death and the incident with his niece are both absent (ll.186–188). In 4.4, the first twelve lines are absent (where Elizabeth reports to Rivers that Edward has been captured).
 Some lines are also added to the play. In 1.1, four lines are added at the beginning of Henry's declaration that he would rather see civil war than yield the throne; "Ah Plantagenet, why seekest thou to depose me?/Are we not both Plantagenets by birth?/And from two brothers lineally descent?/Suppose by right and equity thou be king." Also in 1.1, a line is inserted when York asks Henry if he agrees to the truce and Henry replies, "Convey the soldiers hence, and then I will." Most significant is in Act 5, Scene 1, where the incident involving Clarence's return to the Lancastrian side is completely different from the text found in the Folio, and is taken entirely from the octavo text of The True Tragedy of Richard Duke of York (1595).
 Several lines are spoken by characters other than who speak in the Folio text, particularly in relation to Clarence. For example, in 2.1, it is Clarence who says Edward's "I wonder how our princely father scaped,/Or whether he be scaped away or no/From Clifford and Northumberland's pursuit." Clarence also speaks Richard's "Three glorious suns, each one a perfect sun,/Not separated with the racking clouds/But severed in a pale clear-shining sky," Edward's "Sweet Duke of York, our prop to lean upon/Now thou art gone, we have no staff, no stay," and Richard's "Great lord of Warwick, if we should recount/Our baleful news, and at each word's deliverance/Stab poniards in our flesh till all were told,/The words would add more anguish than the wounds."
 The presentation of the character of Montague also differs from the Folio text. Montague is not present in 1.1, and as such, his lines are either spoken by Clarence or omitted. He is introduced in 1.2, but with some notable changes to the text; when York is giving his men instructions, his order to Montague, "Brother, thou shalt to London presently" (l.36) is changed to "Cousin, thou shalt to London presently," York's reiteration of the order "My brother Montague shall post to London" (l.54) is changed to "Hast you to London my cousin Montague," and Montague's "Brother, I go, I'll win them, fear it not" (l.60) is changed to "Cousin, I go, I'll win them, fear it not." Additionally, the report of the death of Warwick and Montague's brother Thomas Neville in 2.3 is different from the text; "son" in line 15 is replaced with "father," "brother" in line 19 is replaced with "son" and "gentleman" in line 23 is replaced with "Salisbury."
 The character of Elizabeth's son, the Marquess of Dorset, is introduced just after the marriage of Elizabeth and Edward (4.1). In the text, Dorset does not appear until Richard III.
 The Tragedy of Richard III
 Of the 3,887 lines comprising the First Folio text of the play, Howell cut only 72; roughly 1.8% of the total. Some of these lines include Richard's reference in 1.3 to Queen Elizabeth's family fighting for the House of Lancaster during the Wars of the Roses (ll.127–130). Also absent is Margaret warning Dorset that he is only recently made a noble and doesn't yet fully understand the value of his role, Richard telling Dorset that this is good council, and the subsequent discussion between Richard and Margaret about eyries (ll.254–272). In 2.1, Edward's reference to "the precious image of our dear Redeemer" is absent (l.122). In 3.1, Richard's comparison of himself to "the formal Vice Iniquity" is absent (ll.82–83), as is his instruction to Buckingham in 3.5 to tell the people that Edward once put someone to death for saying he would make his son "heir to the Crown, meaning, indeed, his house" (ll.74–77). Absent from 4.4 is Elizabeth's accusation that Richard is using the crown to hide his murder of her two sons (ll.134–137) and Richard's subsequent references to "Humphrey Hower" (ll.166–168). Sir Christopher's list of nobles fighting for Richard is absent from 4.5 (ll.11–15), as is Stanley's list of the nobles who have died during the battle from 5.7 (ll.12–15)
 The character of Lord Grey is not portrayed as Queen Elizabeth's son, but simply as a kinsman; only Dorset is her son. In the text, although there is some confusion and overlapping regarding the two characters in the early scenes, in the latter half of the play, they are both depicted as her sons.
 After the murder of Clarence, Sir Richard Ratcliffe is revealed to have been watching the entire time from a balcony overlooking the room. As the murderer disposes of the body, Ratcliffe quietly leaves.
 Jane Shore is present in 3.2; when Catesby comes to see Hastings, Shore comes out of Hastings' house as he prepares himself to meet with Stanley. In the play, Shore is mentioned as the mistress of Edward IV and Hastings, but never appears on-stage.
 Lovell and Ratcliffe are present throughout 4.1; listening to Lady Anne, the Duchess of Gloucester and Queen Elizabeth lamenting the fact that Richard has been made king.
 Dorset is present as a member of Richmond's council from 5.2 onwards; in the text, Dorset is not seen after he leaves England. In 5.2, Dorset speaks the lines assigned to the Earl of Oxford/Second Lord.
 Just prior to the appearance of the ghosts in 5.4, the Duchess of Gloucester's lines where she promises to pray for Richard's enemies and hopes that the spirits of those he has murdered haunts him (4.4.180–185) are repeated in voiceover.
 The play ends differently from the text. After Richmond is finished speaking, the camera moves away and begins to pan across a huge pyramid of bodies. Off-camera, a woman can be heard laughing. Eventually, the camera moves up the pyramid, and sitting atop, cradling Richard's body, is Margaret.
 The Comedy of Errors
 Some minor lines are omitted from various scenes; most of the discussion between Antipholus (S) and Dromio (S) regarding Father Time and baldness (2.2.75–109); Luciana's report of what Dromio (E) told her as to why Antipholus (E) would not come home to dinner (2.2.-160-162); Dromio (S)'s "Your cake here is warm within; you stand here in the cold./It would make a man mad as a buck to be so bought and sold" (3.1.72–73); the argument between Dromio (S), Dromio (E) and Antipholus (E) about birds without feathers and fish without fins (3.1.79–84); Antipholus (E)'s denial that he is having an affair with the Courtesan (3.1.112–114); the reference to "America, the Indies" during the discussion regarding Nell (3.2.136–140); several lines are omitted from Adriana's appeal to the Duke in 5.1 (ll.146–147, ll.150–152 and l.158); Antipholus (E)'s description of Pinch (5.1.238–240); Aegeon's "Though now this grain'd face of mine be hid/In sap-consuming winter's drizzled snow" (5.1.312–313)
 At various points in the production, Aegeon wanders listlessly around the set, unlike the play, where he appears in the opening and closing scene only. In the production, he appears at the start of 3.1, 4.1, 4.3 and 5.1.
 A small scene is added between 3.2 and 4.1 where Antipholus (S) is standing on his balcony and sees Antipholus (E) wandering in the market place. However, he rubs his eyes, looks at his glass of wine and dismisses what he has seen.
 The Two Gentlemen of Verona
 1.1 begins with Mercatio and Eglamour attempting to formally woo Julia; Mercatio by showing her a coffer overflowing with gold coins, Eglamour by displaying a parchment detailing his family history (there is no dialogue in this scene).
 The capture of Silvia and the flight of Eglamour is seen, as opposed to merely being described.
 Eglamour is also present at the end of 5.4 (once again without any dialogue).
 Love's Labour's Lost
 A large number of lines are cut from every scene in the play. Some of the more notable omissions include, from 1.1, Longaville's "Fat paunches have lean pats, and dainty bits/Make rich the ribs but bankrupt quite the wits" (ll.26–27); Berowne's "study is like the heaven's glorious sun,/That will not be deep-searched with saucy looks;/Small have continual plodders ever won,/Save base authority from others' books" (ll.84–87); the discussion between the Berowne and the others regarding corn, geese and Spring (ll.96–109); Berowne's condemnation of study, "while it doth study to have what it would,/It doth forget to do the thing it should;/And when it hath the thing it hunteth most,/'Tis won as towns with fire – so won, so lost" (ll.142–145); some of the dialogue discussing Armado and the initial dialogue upon the arrival of Costard and Dull (ll.176–188); and the dialogue between Berowne and Costard which ends the scene (ll.293–302). Absent from 1.2 is most of the discussion between Moth and Armado as to how Armado may get three years' worth of study into an hour (ll.33–55); the discussion between Moth and Armado regarding the four complexions (ll.83–111); and Armado's references to duelling in his soliloquy (ll.169–171). Absent from 2.1 is the second set of word play between Berowne and Rosaline (ll.178–191); and most of the conversation between Boyet and Longaville (ll.198–206). Absent from 3.1 is most of the opening conversation between Moth and Armado regarding love (ll.6–49). Absent from 4.1 is most of the conversation between the Princess and the Forester regarding the deer (ll.11–41); the concluding lines of Armado's letter to Jaquenetta, "Thus dost thou hear the Nemean lion roar/'Gainst thee, thou lamb, that standest as his prey./Submissive fall his princely feet before,/And he from forage will incline to play./But if thou strive, poor soul, what art thou then?/Food for his rage, repasture for his den" (ll.87–92); the discussion between Boyet, Maria and Costard about aiming (ll.128–140); and most of Costard's closing soliloquy (ll.143–148). Absent from 4.2 is some of the dialogue between Costard and Holofernes (ll.80–88). 4.3 is especially heavily cut, with some of the absences including the opening few lines from Berowne's soliloquy (ll.1–7), his initial aside upon the arrival of the King, "Shot, by heaven! Proceed, sweet Cupid. Thou hast thumped him with thy bird-bolt under the left pap. In faith, secrets" (ll.21–23); most of the King's sonnet (ll.31–41); most of Berowne and the King's asides upon the arrival of Longaville (ll.45–53); most of Berowne, the King and Longaville's asides upon the arrival of Dumaine (ll.77–89); most of Berowne's argument that Rosaline is the most beautiful of the ladies (ll.231–242); and Berowne's closing lines after the others have left (ll.356–361). Absent from 5.1 is the conversation where Moth gets the intellectual and linguistic better of Holofernes (ll.37–76). Also absent from 5.1 is most of Costard's speech in which he uses the word "honorificabilitudinitatibus" (ll.39–42).  Absent from 5.2 is Boyet's report of Moth's rehearsing for the masque (ll.97–118); some of the mockery of Moth when he tries to recite his lines (ll.166–174); most of the dialogue between the King and Rosaline disguised as the Princess (ll.219–226); some of Berowne's explanation as to how the ladies knew what the men were up to (ll.462–467 and ll.474–481); the conversation regarding how many Worthies there are supposed to be (ll.485–505); and some of the insults shouted at Holofernes (ll.607–611).
 1.1 and 1.2 are intercut. 1.1. runs to line 175, and then cuts to 1.2, which runs to line 118. At that point, 1.1 picks up at line 189, running to the end, where 1.2 picks up at line 121. The intercutting is structured so as Costard and Dull's exist from the King in 1.1. is followed immediately by their arrival at Armado's in 1.2.
 An 'invented' scene is added between 2.1 and 3.1. In this scene, we see Berowne drafting the poem which is later read by Nathaniel. The lines he writes in the scene (which are heard in voiceover) are taken from the fifth poem of the William Jaggard publication The Passionate Pilgrim; itself a variant of the final version of Berowne's own poem.
 Moth is portrayed by an adult actor in the production, whereas in the play, there are multiple references to him being a child.
 Titus Andronicus
 Some minor lines are omitted from various scenes, such as Lavinia's "Ay, for these slips have made him noted long" (2.3.87), Titus' "Ah, wherefore dost thou urge the name of hands,/To bid Aeneas tell the tale twice o'er,/How Troy was burnt and he made miserable?" (3.2.26–28), Marcus' "What, what! The lustful sons of Tamora/Performers of this heinous, bloody deed" (4.1.78–79), and Titus and Marcus' brief conversation about Taurus and Aries (4.3.68–75).
 Several lines from the Q1 text which were removed in subsequent editions are used; at 1.1.35 Titus' "bearing his valiant sons/in coffins from the field" continues with "and at this day,/To the Monument of that Andronicy/Done sacrifice of expiation,/And slaine the Noblest prisoner of the Gothes." These lines work in tandem with a rearrangement of the opening scenes to avoid a continuity problem. The lines concern the sacrifice of Alarbus, which has not yet happened in the text. However, Howell got around this problem by beginning the play at 1.1.64 – the entrance of Titus. Then, at 1.1.168, after the sacrifice of Alarbus, lines 1.1.1 to 1.1.63 (the introductions of Bassianus and Saturninus) take place, thus Titus' reference to Alarbus' sacrifice makes chronological sense.
 The character of Young Lucius is a much more important figure in the adaptation than in the play; he is present throughout Act 1, he retrieves the murder weapon after the death of Mutius; it is his knife which Titus uses to kill the fly; he aids in the capture of Chiron and Demetrius; he is present throughout the final scene.
 Also changed is the fate of Aaron's baby, who is seen dead in a coffin in the final scene. In the play, and most productions, it is implied that the child lives.

See also 
 An Age of Kings (1960)
 The Spread of the Eagle (1963)
 The Wars of the Roses (1963; 1965)
 Shakespeare: The Animated Tales (1992–1994)
 ShakespeaRe-Told (2005)
 The Hollow Crown (2012; 2016)

References

External links
 British Universities Film and Video Council
 The BBC Television Shakespeare at Screenonline
 "The Television Revolution"

1978 British television series debuts
1985 British television series endings
BBC television dramas
Cultural depictions of Cicero
Films based on A Midsummer Night's Dream
Films based on As You Like It
Films based on Antony and Cleopatra
Films based on Coriolanus
Films based on Hamlet
Films based on Henry IV (play)
Films based on Henry V (play)
Films based on Henry VI (play)
Films based on Henry VIII (play)
Films based on Julius Caesar (play)
Films based on King John (play)
Films based on King Lear
Films based on Love's Labour's Lost
Films based on Macbeth
Films based on Much Ado About Nothing
Films based on Othello
Films based on Richard II (play)
Films based on Richard III (play)
Films based on Romeo and Juliet
Films based on The Comedy of Errors
Films based on The Merchant of Venice
Films based on The Taming of the Shrew
Films based on The Tempest
Films based on The Two Gentlemen of Verona
Films based on Timon of Athens
Films based on Titus Andronicus
Films based on Twelfth Night
Films based on works by William Shakespeare
Television series set in the 14th century
Television series set in the 15th century